= Secular Buddhism =

Form of Buddhism without supernatural content

Secular Buddhism, also called Naturalistic, Immanent, or Pragmatic Buddhism, is a form of Buddhism that interprets Buddhist scriptures through a framework divested of supernatural and metaphysical content. Emerging out of Buddhist modernism, it follows socio-historical patterns similar to the European Renaissance and Protestant Reformation, deriving ethical values from secular humanism and direct observations of nature over belief in divine or superhuman agency. Although some proponents distinguish themselves from the "secular" label because of its anti-religious connotations, the term is used to identify a broad conceptual category for all schools of Buddhism whose teachings comply with the natural laws known to science.

== Global socio-historical undercurrents ==
The origins of Secular Buddhism at the turn of the 21st century trace back to four overlapping socio-historical trends: the Renaissance, cultural shifts in the 1960s, global secularization, and Buddhist Modernism.

=== The Renaissance ===
Commentators trace the genesis of Secular Buddhism to the distant influences of the 15th-century European Renaissance and the 16th-century Protestant Reformation. Whereas the Renaissance introduced humanism, a renewed interest in classical philosophy, and systematic scientific inquiry, the Protestant Reformation challenged the absolute authority of the Catholic Church. The subsequent restructuring of Christianity elevated the spiritual standing of the laity, encouraged a direct relationship with the divine, and recast worldly callings as spiritually meaningful. Emboldened by these developments, a growing movement of European thinkers and artists began relying on reason rather than religious insight to make sense of the world.

=== The 1960s ===
While Western interest in Buddhism dates back to the 19th century, deep engagement with formal Buddhist practices expanded exponentially during the 1960s. Bhikkhu Bodhi, an American Theravada monk, attributes this surge to a distinct convergence of cultural conditions, including widespread disillusionment with institutional religion, Buddhism's appeal as a non-theistic alternative, the rise of existential philosophy, humanistic psychology's focus on personal growth, and a growing reliance on psychotherapy to navigate modern alienation and stress. Concurrently, the popularity of psychedelic drugs exposed hidden dimensions of consciousness, sparking interest in Eastern spirituality. It was in the 1960s that the mind came to be viewed as the primary source of health, purpose, and fulfillment—an orientation Bodhi contends laid the groundwork for a distinctly secular expression of Buddhism.

=== Secularization ===
The term "secularism" was coined by the British journalist George Holyoake (1817—1906) to describe a collective, non-theistic aspiration. An early adopter in 1853 noted that "the term Secularism is justified by its including a large number of persons who are not Atheists, and uniting them for action which has Secularism for its object." For clarification, Holyoake aligned the secular objective with the pursuit of a good, "which is dictated by Nature, which is attainable by material means, and which is of immediate service to humanity — a religiousness to which the idea of God is not essential, nor the denial of the idea necessary."

Today, in contrast, the base word “secular” is used in different ways, including to describe explicit beliefs. For example, if a Buddhist does not believe in rebirth as a hungry ghost, a realm called “hell,” or in fending off evil spirits through ritual, the more "secular" they are. Moreover, today the word helps describe a grand socio-political dynamic involving a culturally and historically conditioned, interwoven clash between the sacred and secular. Like all modern religions, Buddhism participates in the “secularization” process.

A study by Norris and Inglehart conducted between 1950 and 2007 in 191 nations and 80 cross-national societies throughout the world sheds light on this dynamic. First, due to rising levels of personal security, the publics of virtually all advanced industrial societies have been moving toward more secular orientations. Modernization (the process of industrialization, urbanization, and rising levels of education and wealth) greatly weakens the influence of religious institutions in affluent societies, bringing lower rates of attendance at religious services and making religion subjectively less important in people's lives.

Second, due to demographic trends in poorer societies, the world as a whole now has more people with traditional religious views than ever before. In other words, rich societies are secularizing, but they contain a dwindling proportion of the world's population; while poor societies are not secularizing and they contain a rising share of the world's population. Reflecting on this second conclusion, Norris and Inglehart caution: "it would be a major mistake to assume that secularization is triumphantly advancing and that religion will eventually disappear throughout the world."

=== Buddhist Modernism ===
According to David McMahon, Buddhism Modernism is a conceptual framework for including those forms of Buddhism that combine the orthodox teachings of the tradition with the ramifications of the Renaissance, scientific rationalism, Romanticism, Protestantism, psychology, and contemporary social and political thought. Although influenced by the West, it is not simply a Western phenomenon, but rather refers to a global dynamic that encompasses various movements created by both Asians and Western Buddhists.. The framework accepts any form of Buddhism that mixes traditional Buddhism and modern influences, regardless of the amount of—or which—traditional teachings are retained.

As clarified by Winton Higgins, a prominent secular Buddhist, Buddhist Modernism describes the dynamic out of which Secular Buddhism formed, and distinguishes itself from. For Higgins, the modernists include remnants of teachings that Secular Buddhism relegates to the past. Stephen Batchelor concurs. According to Batchelor, the "modern" movements have an ambivalent relationship with the dogmas and hierarchies of the Buddhist institutions from which they originated. Little effort has been made to develop an understanding of Buddhism that confronts the traditional doctrines of karma, rebirth, heavens, hells, and supernatural powers.

== Proponents and their influencers ==
=== Stephen Batchelor ===
Stephen Batchelor is a leading proponent of Secular Buddhism. Following his experience as an ordained monk in Tibetan Buddhism and a Korean Zen practitioner, he abandoned the traditional teachings in favor of an agnostic approach, reinterpreting the Dharma for a secular demographic.

Batchelor's contribution to the movement spans decades. In Buddhism Without Beliefs (1997), he portrays Siddhārtha Gautama as a historical figure rather than a religious icon, and questions traditional doctrines regarding rebirth and karma. In Confession of a Buddhist Atheist (2010), he details his initial exposure to vipassanā meditation under S. N. Goenka in 1974, and how he and his wife Martine resumed the practice in the mid-1980s in Devon, England.

In a 2012 article published by the Journal of Global Buddhism, Batchelor formally articulated his position in a peer-reviewed paper entitled "A Secular Buddhism." There, he reinterprets the Four Noble Truths not as metaphysical beliefs leading to a transcendent awakening, but as actionable "tasks" designed to overcome reactivity in daily life.

Batchelor describes his hermeneutical method in After Buddhism: Rethinking the Dharma for a Secular Age (2015). Examining canonical texts written centuries after the Buddha’s death, he imagines a pragmatic, historical Gautama without divine attributes, disseminating Buddhist principles in 5th-century BCE India. From this perspective, he interprets core elements of the Dharma before the Buddha's teachings “mutated” into institutional orthodoxies. Drawing inspiration from the Latin root word saeculum (meaning "this generation" or "the current age"), he frames his project as a mandate to adapt the Buddha's original insights for the present era.

His secular orientation was heavily influenced by the English Theravada monk Ñāṇavīra Thera. In Clearing the Path, Ñāṇavīra brought the Pali Canon into dialogue with Western existentialists such as Jean-Paul Sartre, establishing a precedent for Batchelor to interpret early Buddhist texts through a modern European lens.

=== Secular Meditation Centers ===
An account published in 1998 of how the first American vipassanā centers opened provides a glimpse into the way the secular Buddhist movement began in the United States. It tracks the contributions of five key figures, three of which are highlighted here. First, Joseph Goldstein, who grew up in the Catskill Mountains and studied with Mahasi Sayadaw, a Burmese Theravada Buddhist monk. Second, Sharon Salzberg, from New York City, who studied with Mahasi Sayadaw and S.N. Goenka, who was also Batchelor's vipassanā instructor. Third, Jack Kornfield, whose family lived in various cities throughout the United States and studied with Mahasi Sayadaw and Ajahn Chah, a Thai Buddhist monk.

These three went further than their Asian mentors in presenting vipassanā as a practice independent of the Theravada tradition. Whereas Mahasi Sayadaw and S.N. Goenka provided a modernized teaching that already offered transformative insight through practice alone (reducing the role of Buddhist doctrine and the need for monastic rules), Goldstein, Salzberg, and Kornfield adapted what they learned for American sensibilities.

The meditation techniques used by Goldstein and Kornfield were a hybrid of the Mahasi and Goenka methods. The first days of their retreats typically focused on the mindfulness of breathing. While Mahasi never taught loving-kindness meditation (metta) together with vipassanā, Goldstein and Kornfield ended each retreat with a guided loving-kindness meditation, as was done in the Goenka courses.

In 1976, Kornfield, Goldstein, and Salzberg, together with Jacqueline Schwartz, bought a former Catholic seminary in Barre, Massachusetts, which became a permanent, year-round meditation retreat. In 1981, Jack Kornfield moved to Marin County, California, and co-founded a sister meditation center to the Massachusetts facility. Both the Massachusetts and Marin County centers have institutional mechanisms for approving teachers.

While some instructors at these centers may blend supernatural phenomena with practice, others take a purely empirical stance.

=== Gil Fronsdal ===
Gil Fronsdal, a trained Zen Buddhist, later schooled in vipassanā meditation in Burma by Mahasi Sayadaw (mentioned above), is a guiding teacher at a meditation center in Redwood City, California. Fronsdal's facility is informally associated with the Massachusetts and Marin County meditation centers also mentioned above.

Fronsdal refers to his teachings as "Naturalistic Buddhism." While he acknowledges his beliefs align with secular Buddhism, he considers "secular" a term that stands in opposition to "religious" and "spiritual." Since Fronsdal believes Buddhism is a religion and his practice is "deeply religious," he prefers "naturalistic" instead. Another nuance of Fronsdal's position is that, unlike Stephen Batchelor's, he does not find it necessary to confront the supernatural roots of the tradition, but simply sees no need to include them in the Buddhism he practices.

Nevertheless, Fronsdal's teachings bear a family resemblance to Batchelor's. While Fronsdal prefers the term "Naturalistic Buddhism," he is committed to a rational, evidence-based understanding of the Dharma. By excluding the supernatural elements of the original teachings and offering an alternative path derived from those teachings, he places his practice within the broader spectrum of secular Buddhist thought. The insights he extracts from the Pali Canon (mostly the entirety of The Book of Eights) are free of rebirth, karmic operations over multiple lifetimes, heaven, hells, devas, psychic powers, or any other idea falling "outside the natural laws known to science." As for describing his practice as "deeply religious," he clarifies that "religious" refers to a sense of appreciation for the world that is so special, so deep, and so total, it feels sacred.

=== Jon Kabat-Zinn ===
Jon Kabat-Zinn is an American professor emeritus of medicine and a pioneer of the therapeutic application of mindfulness. During his formative years, he trained under Nhat Hanh, a Vietnamese Zen Buddhist monk known as the "father of mindfulness," Seung Sahn, a Korean Zen master, and Philip Kapleau, a practitioner of Japanese Sōtō Zen.

In 1979, Kabat-Zinn created a mindfulness-based stress reduction program at the University of Massachusetts Medical School. The approach stripped religious terms, rituals, and doctrine from traditional forms of Buddhist meditation and integrated them into a clinical setting. Kabat-Zinn links mindfulness with a "fundamental universal lawfulness" incidental to Buddhism. Accordingly, attributing mindfulness techniques exclusively to Buddhism is tantamount to suggesting gravity belongs to Britain simply because Isaac Newton identified it. Nevertheless, Kabat-Zinn acknowledges that his stress reduction program remains rooted in the ethical and philosophical heart of the Buddha's teachings.

Although Kabat-Zinn eschews religious or sectarian identity labels, including "Buddhist" or "secular Buddhist," his contributions to the treatment of mental health stemmed from his secular Buddhist orientation.

=== Bhim Rao Ambedkar's Dalit Buddhism ===
Although the emergence of Secular Buddhism as a distinct movement is placed in the 1990s, the works of Bhim Rao Ambedkar (1891–1956) published in the late 1950s align with secular Buddhism and have been retrospectively recognized as an earlier model, fully included within its scope. In contrast to the orientations of Stephen Batchelor and other traditionally schooled Western reformers, Ambedkar's familiarity with Buddhism did not come from years of dedicated practice but from the Buddha's renown as a native cultural icon who introduced a message of salvation applicable to everyone, equally. Ambedkar's foremost concern was to free those oppressed by the religious cosmology fortifying the Indian caste system in which he was raised. While he linked the Buddha's teachings directly to the implementation of egalitarian social reform, after his passing some associates inserted vipassanā (insight) and loving-kindness meditation into the equation.

A major influence on Ambedkar was John Dewey, the American Philosopher who wrote, among other books, A Common Faith. According to those who knew Ambedkar, Dewey was the closest to a guru that Ambedkar had. Ambedkar not only embraced Dewey's teachings but on occasion playfully imitated Dewey's classroom mannerisms long after attending the philosopher's lectures at Columbia University in New York.

Because many of Ambedkar's followers today honor him with superlatives reserved for bodhisattvas in traditional Buddhism, his legacy has been linked with Buddhist modernism. Despite this level of adoration, he explicitly discouraged such attributions, and left behind a secular teaching based on over 400 references to the early Buddhist canons.

=== A Secular Buddhism Based on the Lotus Sutra ===
In an article published by The Indian International Journal of Buddhist Studies in 2024, John R. Tate provides a three-part method to unpack a face-value reading of the Lotus Sūtra's abundance of cosmic imagery and reinterpret the scripture for a secular worldview. The first part relies on scholarly opinions in the field of Mahayana Buddhism to deconstruct a literal interpretation of the text's core image, the climactic revelation of an Eternal Buddha. The second part introduces a replacement for belief in an Eternal Buddha by proposing the phrase: "The conditional emergence of benevolence as gifted by time, process, and potential." (Note: In the Japanese version of Tate's article, the main phrase is 「融智悲、自然のことわりより縁起す」(Yū-chihi, shizen no kotowari yori engisu: “A blend of wisdom and compassion, dependently arising from the patterns of nature.”)) This phrasing is central to Tate's secular interpretation because it articulates an ultimate insight not in a transcendent embodiment, but in the inherent, unfolding capacity for goodness and ethical action within the natural world. The third part of the method seeks to validate the phrase by aligning it with both a traditional understanding of Buddhist doctrine and contemporary socio-philosophical principles.

Tate also links to companion secular prayers that encourage practitioners to shape their lives in the likeness of the proposed immanent ethic. In conclusion, the paper asserts that unlike other forms of Secular Buddhism, this version offers an unadorned, existence-affirming replacement for not only an Eternal Buddha, but God, Allah, Bhagavan, and Brahma.

As to prior influences, the article references Batchelor, Fronsdal, Ambedkar, and Tominaga Nakamoto (1715–1746). By citing Nakamoto, Tate's secular project is traced to a Japanese freethinker in the early 18th century with no apparent connection to the European Renaissance or Protestant Reformation.

=== Other Proponents ===
The spread of Secular Buddhism in the 21st century has been driven in part by online media, with some forms being primarily virtual associations. Noah Rasheta hosts both a podcast and an AI-driven learning platform that provide non-theistic, psychological frameworks for secular Buddhists interested in practical applications of mindfulness meditation. Aiming to make Buddhist concepts accessible for a contemporary demographic, Rasheta uses "secular" not to designate a distinct or superior sect, but to describe an analytical lens through which practitioners can understand traditional Buddhist principles philosophically.

== Critical assessments ==
Secularizing Buddhism: New Perspectives on a Dynamic Tradition, edited by Richard K. Payne (a trained Shingon priest), contains articles critically assessing the impact of secularization on the Buddhist tradition. The following are summaries of three:

=== Phillipe Turenne ===
In his essay "Buddhism without a View: A Friendly Conversation with Stephen Batchelor's Secular Buddhism," Philippe Turenne challenges Stephen Batchelor's secular framework on three grounds. First, Turenne contends that Batchelor’s interpretation of the scriptures is unconvincing: a) he uses the prestige of academic scholarship to lend authority to his ideas without following scholarly methods of historical inquiry, grounding his reading of early texts on an ideological predisposition rather than empirical evidence; b) by equating "authentic" Buddhism with his personal construct of "original" Buddhism, Batchelor creates a new orthodoxy—an exclusive teaching that restricts valid practice entirely to immanence; and c) by replacing metaphysical Buddhism with a teaching better suited for a modern scientific worldview, Batchelor shields his replacement from invalidation, unilaterally dispensing with a transcendent counterweight to challenge its secular and materialistic assumptions.

Second, Turenne criticizes Batchelor for relying on a straw-man argument by setting up a dogmatic caricature of how the Two-Truths doctrine and Buddhist emptiness function in Mahayana Buddhism. He then invalidates the very caricature he created. His rejection of metaphysics leads him to overlook how these traditional doctrines function as rational exercises for a transformative purpose.

Third, Turenne contends that by relegating Buddhism to practical philosophy, Batchelor endorses a system devoid of spiritual awakening. In Turenne's view, this approach rejects not only the traditional goal of liberation, but the very possibility of achieving it.

=== Ron Purser ===
Another article in Payne’s anthology is by Ron Purser, who targets the modern mindfulness movement. Purser is concerned with mindfulness’ role as the new spirituality in a capitalistic, neoliberal order. In theory, neoliberalism proposes that human well-being is enhanced by fostering entrepreneurial freedom and individual skills within an economic framework that favors property rights, free markets, and free trade. Purser suggests that mindfulness not only diverts attention away from the root social, political, and economic issues inherent in capitalism and neoliberalism, but also encourages a muted response.

Neoliberal mindfulness, in Purser's opinion, places responsibility for societal issues on an individual’s shoulders, a situation most apparent in its application to the treatment of stress. During stress-relief sessions, clinicians are not expected to address social injustice, cultural toxicity, or environmental issues that may have created the problem. Instead, mindfulness exercises focus on the present moment, thereby contributing to a kind of social amnesia and the atrophy of a utopian imagination.

According to Purser, traditional mindfulness has been co-opted by elites who collude with and act on behalf of capitalistic institutional interests. They help toxic systems thrive rather than address the historical, cultural, and political conditions these systems produce.

=== Bhikkhu Bodhi ===
In his contribution to Secularizing Buddhism, Theravada monk Bhikkhu Bodhi presents a two-fold critique of the secular approach to the tradition. First, Bodhi argues that secular interpreters selectively remove foundational elements of the Dharma, thereby undermining the original coherence of a profoundly integrated system. He emphasizes that concepts such as saṃsāra, nirvana, karma, and rebirth are not late monastic inventions, but explicit scriptural doctrines integral to Buddhist teachings.

Second, he contends that secular Buddhism relies uncritically on scientific materialism as the sole measure of objective reality. By treating natural science as the exclusive authority on truth, Bodhi argues that secularists dismiss non-material dimensions of existence that are recognized across both Buddhist and non-Buddhist spiritual traditions.

Ultimately, Bodhi cautions secularists against assuming they have a superior understanding of the Dharma compared to traditional Buddhists. He asserts that secular adaptations do not necessarily constitute a more highly evolved form of Buddhism.

=== Responses to Critical Assessments ===
While Payne's compilation is a published resource for evaluating Buddhist secularization, detractors contend that it misrepresents those advocating for Secular Buddhism, especially Batchelor's version of the teachings.. Batchelor never claims to provide the only correct view of Buddhist doctrine but merely suggests a way to reconstruct the dharma for contemporary sensibilities.

== See also ==
- Adevism
- Buddhism in the Americas
- Buddhism in the West
- Buddhist modernism
- Buddhist paths to liberation
- Criticism of Buddhism
- Index of Buddhism-related articles
- Religious views on truth
- Schools of Buddhism
- Secular spirituality
- Shambhala Buddhism
- Similarities between Pyrrhonism and Buddhism
- Spiritual but not religious
- Spiritual naturalism

== Sources ==
- Able, Venessa (2022). "Gil Fronsdal on Immanent and Naturalistic Buddhism". The Dewdrop. Archived from the original on 2023-06-01.
- Ambedkar, Bhim Rao (1957). "The Buddha & His Dhamma". Dr. Babasaheb Ambedkar: Writings and Speeches, vol. 11. Bombay: Siddarth College Publications. Archived from the original on 2023-11-03.
- Batchelor, Stephen (1998). Buddhism Without Beliefs. Penguin.
- Batchelor, Stephen (2010). Confession of a Buddhist Atheist. New York: Spiegel & Grau. ISBN 978-0-385-52706-4.
- Batchelor, Stephen (2012), "A Secular Buddhism", Journal of Global Buddhism, 13: 87–107, archived from the original on 2019-07-05
- Batchelor, Stephen (2015). After Buddhism: Rethinking the Dharma for a Secular Age. New Haven, Connecticut, United States: Yale University Press. ISBN 978-0-300-21622-6.
- Bodhi, Bhikkhu (1998). "Buddhism without Beliefs: Review" (PDF). Journal of Buddhist Ethics. 5: 14–21.
- Bodhi, Bhikkhu (1998b). "A Critical Examination of Ñanavira Thera's 'A Note on Paticcasamuppada': Part Two" (PDF). Journal of Buddhist Studies. 15 (2): 157–181. doi:10.1558/bsrv.v15i2.14698.
- Bodhi, Bhikkhu (2021). "Manifesting the Buddha Dharma". Secularizing Buddhism: New Perspectives on a Dynamic Tradition. Boulder: Shambala Publications, Inc. pp. 166–67.
- Boice, Barry (2010). "The Pioneer: Jon Kabat-Zinn on working toward a Mindful Society". Lion's Roar.
- Booth, Robert (2017). "Master of mindfulness, Jon Kabat-Zinn: 'People are losing their minds. That is what we need to wake up to'". The Guardian. Archived from the original on 2026-05-21.
- Braun, Erik (2013). "S. N. Goenka, Pioneer of Secular Meditation Movement, Dies at 90". Tricycle:The Buddhist Review.
- Bryant, Miranda (22 January 2022). "From MLK to Silicon Valley, how the world fell for 'father of mindfulness'". The Guardian. Archived from the original on 22 January 2022.
- Cartwright, Mark (2020). "Renaissance Humanism". World History Encyclopedia.
- Cooper, David E. (2021). "Nanavira Thera. The Hermit of Bundala". Daily Philosophy.
- Fitzpatrick, Aidyn (2019). "The Monk Who Taught the World Mindfulness Awaits the End of This Life". Time.com.
- Fronsdal, Gil (1998), "Insight Meditation in the United States: Life, Liberty, and the Pursuit of Happiness", in Prebish, C.S.; Tanaka, K.K. (eds.), The Faces of Buddhism in America, University of California Press
- Fronsdal, Gil (2014). "Natural Buddhism". Insight Journal. Barre Center for Buddhist Studies.
- Fronsdal, Gil (2021). "Naturalistic Buddhism". Secularizing Buddhism: New Perspectives on a Dynamic Tradition. Boulder: Shambala Publications, Inc. pp. 265–284.
- Gokhale, Pradeep (2021). "Ambedkar and Modern Buddhism: Continuity and Discontinuity" (PDF). Classical Buddhism, Neo-Buddhism and The Question of Caste. New York: Routledge. pp. 262–64.
- Hennigar, Mallory (2021). "Boundation & Bindās: Ambedkarite Youth In a Global Buddhist Movement". Syracuse University Dissertations (1301): 202.
- Higgins, Winton (2012), "The Coming of Secular Buddhism: A Synoptic View", Journal of Global Buddhism, 13: 110–113, archived from the original on 2018-04-11
- Higgins, Winton (2021). "An Unconvincing Case Against Secular Buddhism". Tricycle. Archived from the original on 2025-03-19.
- Holyoake, George Jacob (1871). The Principles of Secularism Illustrated, Third Edition. Revised. Bookstore 282 Strand, London.
- Jackson, Roger K. (2021). "Avoiding Rebirth: Modern Buddhist Views on Past and Future Lives". Secularizing Buddhism: New Perspectives on a Dynamic Tradition. Boulder: Shambala Publications, Inc. pp. 239–64.
- Kabat-Zinn, Jon (1991). Full catastrophe living: using the wisdom of your body and mind to face stress, pain, and illness. Delta Trade Paperbacks. ISBN 0-385-30312-2.
- Kabat-Zinn, Jon (October 2017). "Too Early to Tell: The Potential Impact and Challenges—Ethical and Otherwise—Inherent in the Mainstreaming of Dharma in an Increasingly Dystopian World". Mindfulness. 8 (5): 1125–1135. doi:10.1007/s12671-017-0758-2. PMC 5605584. PMID 28989546.
- Kathirasan, K. (2023-02-20). "The Mindfulness-Based Wellbeing Enhancement (MBWE) Curriculum". Introducing Mindfulness-Based Wellbeing Enhancement. London: Routledge. pp. 237–248. ISBN 978-1-003-32295-5.
- Manitoba (2025). "Buddhism in an Era of Secularism" (PDF). Buddhism: A Supplemental Resource for Grade 12 World of Religions: A Canadian Perspective.
- Mason, Kirk (2025). "Dr. Bhimrao Ramji Ambedkar: A Secular Buddhist Vision for Liberation". Secular Buddhist Network.
- McMahon, David L. (2012). "Buddhist Modernism". In McMahan, David L. (ed.). Buddhism in the Modern World. Routledge. ISBN 978-0-415-78014-8.
- McMahon, David L. (2021). "Buddhism and Secular Subjectivities". In Payne, Richard (ed.). Secularizing Buddhism: New Perspectives on a Dynamic Tradition. Shambhala. ISBN 9781611808896.
- Ñāṇavīra Thera (2003) [1988]. Clearing the Path: Writings of Ñāṇavīra Thera (1960–1965). Path Press.
- Nanda, Meera (2007). Breaking the Spell of Dharma and other essays. New Delhi: Three Essays Collective. pp. 61–63. ISBN 978-8188789559.
- Norris, Pippa; Inglehart, Ronald (2011). Sacred and Secular: Religion and Politics Worldwide (2nd ed.). Cambridge University Press. ISBN 978-1-107-64837-1.
- Parsons, Talcott (1978). Action Theory and the Human Condition. The Free Press. ISBN 0-02-923990-7.
- Payne, Richard (2021). "Editor's Introduction". Secularizing Buddhism: New Perspectives on a Dynamic Tradition. Boulder: Shambala Publications, Inc.
- Payne, Richard (2021b). "Faculty Bio". Institute of Buddhist Studies.
- Payne, Richard; Kemp, Casey A. (2021). Secular Buddhism. Boulder: Oxford Research Encyclopedia of Religion. p. 1. Archived from the original on 2024-06-15.
- Purser, Ron (2021). "Secular Buddhism in a Neoliberal Age". Secularizing Buddhism: New Perspectives on a Dynamic Tradition. Boulder: Shambala Publications, Inc. pp. 207–219.
- Pye, Michael (1990). "Introduction". Emerging from Meditation. University of Hawaii Press. ISBN 978-0-415-78014-8.
- Ranallo-Higgins, Frederick M.; Agsar, Wendy B. (Spring 2024). "Buddhist Podcasts". Tricycle: The Buddhist Review.
- Rasheta, Noah (2018). ’No-Nonsense Buddhism for Beginners. Callisto Publishing. ISBN 978-1641520478.
- Rasheta, Noah (March 10, 2026). "We're All Downstream". The Secular Buddhist Network.
- Sangharakshita (1993). The Drama of Cosmic Enlightenment: Parables, Myths, and Symbols of the White Lotus Sutra. Windhorse Publications. ISBN 0-904766-59-4.
- Schwerk, Dagmar (2022). "Book Review: Secularizing Buddhism: New Perspectives on a Dynamic Tradition". Journal of Global Buddhism. 27 (1): 87–94. doi:10.26034/lu.jgb.2022.2331.
- Sharma, Nirja (1998). "An Buddhist Liberation in India and B.R. Ambedkar" (PDF). Department of Buddhist Studies, University of Delhi: 1.
- Slott, Mike (2021). "A missed opportunity: a review of 'Secularizing Buddhism'". Secular Buddhist Network. Archived from the original on 2025-01-23.
- Tate, John (2024). "An Ultimate from Immanence: Lotus Buddhism Redefined for a Secular Worldview" (PDF). The Indian International Journal of Buddhist Studies (24): 209–50. ISSN 0972-4893.
- Tate, John (2026). "A Secular Buddhism Based on the Lotus Sutra". Secular Buddhist Network.
- Taylor, Charles (2007). A Secular Age. Harvard University Press. ISBN 978-0-674-98691-6.
- Turenne, Philippe (2021). "Buddhism without a View: A Friendly Conversation with Stephen Batchelor's Secular Buddhism". Secularizing Buddhism: New Perspectives on a Dynamic Tradition. Boulder: Shambala Publications, Inc. pp. 185–205.
- UMass, Memorial Health. "About the Center for Mindfulness". UMass Memorial. Archived from the original on 15 May 2026.
