= Spirit Rock Meditation Center =

Meditation center in Woodacre, California

Coordinates: 38.01942°N 122.64497°W

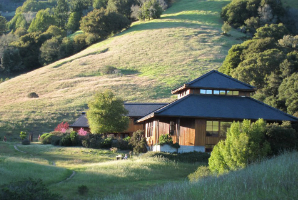
Retreat Meditation Hall at sunset

Spirit Rock Meditation Center, commonly called simply Spirit Rock, is a meditation center in Woodacre, California. It focuses on the teachings of the Buddha as presented in the vipassana, or Insight Meditation, tradition. It was founded in 1985 as Insight Meditation West, and is visited by an estimated 40,000 people a year. The San Francisco Chronicle has called it one of "the Bay Area's best-known centers for Buddhist meditation."

== History ==
In 1975 the Insight Meditation Society (IMS) was founded in Barre, Massachusetts, by a group of Western meditation teachers trained in Asia, including Jack Kornfield, Joseph Goldstein, Sharon Salzberg, and Jacqueline Schwartz. In 1986, after ten years at IMS, Kornfield moved to Northern California with his family and began hosting a Monday night meditation class in a private home in San Anselmo. Eventually the class expanded to a clinic and then to a local church. In 1985 a group of meditation students and teachers in the San Francisco Bay Area incorporated as Insight Meditation West, for the purpose of acquiring land and establishing a west coast Insight Meditation center. The group included Kornfield, James Baraz, Sylvia Boorstein, Anna Douglas, and Howard Cohn. The incorporator and first board president was Lloyd Burton, who later founded the Insight Meditation Community of Denver.

In 1988, with funds from an anonymous donation, 412 acres of undeveloped land in the San Geronimo Valley, an hour north of San Francisco, was purchased from The Nature Conservancy in order to start a permanent meditation center, and the name Spirit Rock Meditation Center was formally adopted. In 1990 temporary construction trailers were erected to house the community meditation hall, administrative offices and caretaker residences. Construction for permanent replacement facilities began in 2014. and in 2016, a new Community Meditation Center, staff village and administrative buildings were completed.

The residential retreat center opened in July 1998. The majority of the center's land is protected by an open space easement and kept in conservation.

== Teachings ==
The teachings at Spirit Rock focus on the practice of vipassanā meditation as taught in the Theravada tradition, emphasizing mindfulness and lovingkindness. Practices focus on training and quieting the mind, the cultivation of lovingkindness and compassion, the teachings of the Buddha as found in the Pāli Canon, and on incorporating mindfulness and the Dharma into daily life. Retreats are modeled on those held for lay people in the Thai Forest Tradition and the Burmese vipassanā movement, including sitting and walking meditation, meetings with the teachers and the observation of silence by practitioners.

In addition to Insight Meditation teachings, Spirit Rock hosts teachers from Zen, Tibetan and nondual traditions as guest teachers throughout the year. Visiting teachers have included the 14th Dalai Lama, Thích Nhất Hạnh, Preah Maha Ghosananda, Anagarika Munindra, Kalu Rinpoche, Ram Dass, Pema Chödrön, Tsoknyi Rinpoche, Huston Smith, Adyashanti, Tara Brach, Alice Walker, Zoketsu Norman Fischer and others.

== Programs ==
A portion of the classes, daylongs and retreats at Spirit Rock are organized as affinity programs for a range of marginalized populations. These programs center self-identified people of color (BIPOC), women, LGBTQIA+ community, families, young adults, and elders. Class offerings also address the application of Buddhist teachings to modern issues such as addiction and trauma. Spirit Rock offers scholarships to make classes and retreats available to those who cannot otherwise afford them.

== Organization ==
The center is supported by fees charged for classes and retreats, and by donations, in the Buddhist tradition of dāna. Paid staff runs the day-to-day operations of Spirit Rock with support from volunteers. Teachers on residential retreats are supported by dāna from the students, as is the practice in the Buddhist tradition. but on non-residential retreats, daylong retreats, events and classes teachers are supported by fees paid by attendees to Spirit Rock.

Spirit Rock's teaching programs are developed by the Guiding Teachers Council. A volunteer Board of Directors, composed of teachers and community members, is the central decision-making body for Spirit Rock. The work of the Board is supported by a number of committees.

Spirit Rock teachers include Sylvia Boorstein, Gil Fronsdal, Jack Kornfield, and Phillip Moffit.

== Collaborations ==
A number of Spirit Rock teachers also offer their teachings, or serve on Boards of Directors, at other meditation centers, including the East Bay Meditation Center in Oakland, California, the Modesto Almond Blossom Sangha in Modesto, California, the Insight Meditation Society in Barre, Massachusetts, the Insight Meditation Center in Redwood City, California, the Mountain Stream Meditation Center in Nevada City, California.
