= Mahasi Sayadaw =

Burmese Theravada Buddhist monk (1904–1982)

Mahasi Sayadaw U Sobhana
- မဟာစည်ဆရာတော် ဦးသောဘန
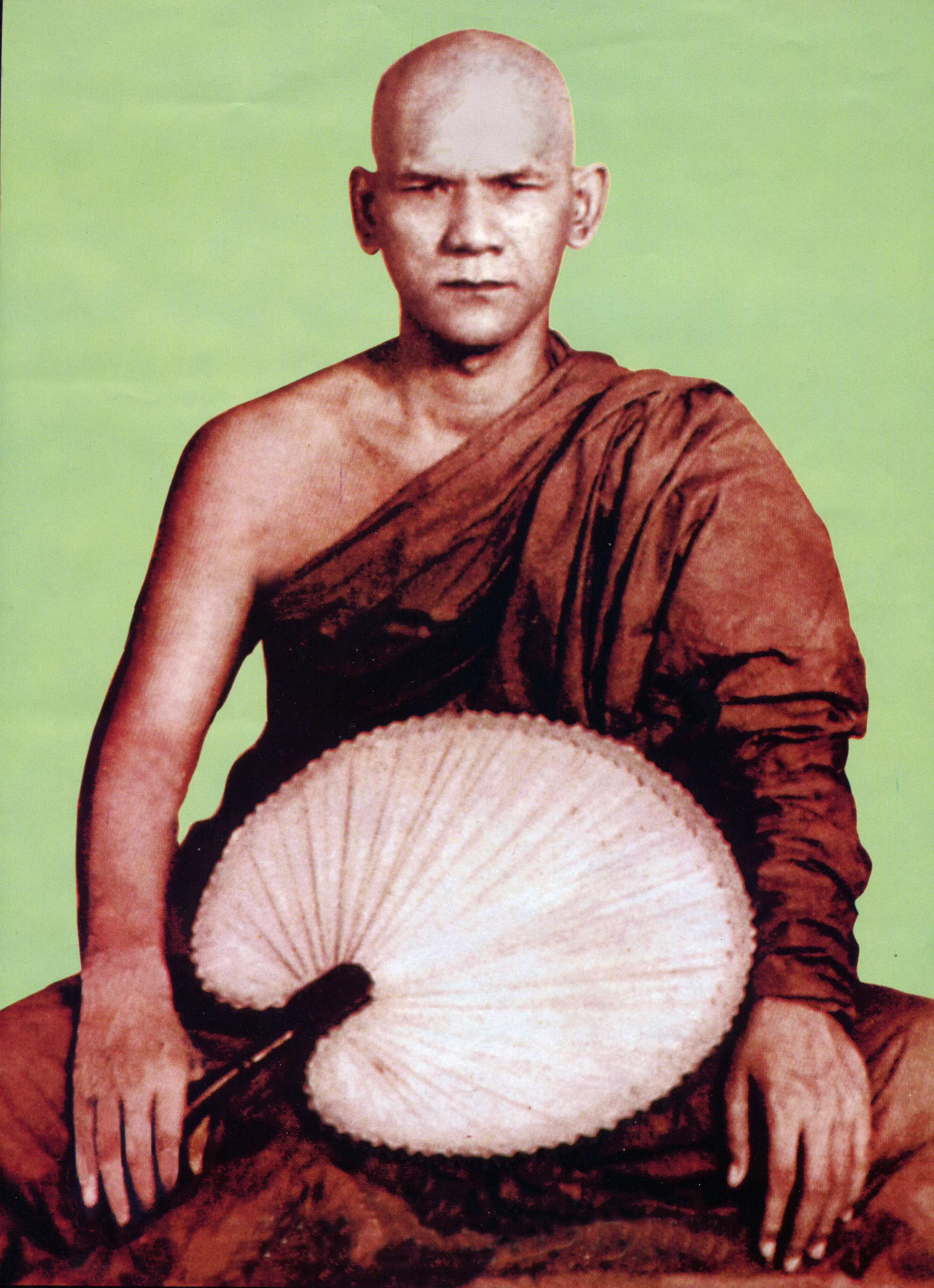
- The Venerable Mahasi Sayadaw
- Title: Sayadaw

Personal life
- Born: Maung Thwin; 29 July 1904 Seikkhun, Shwebo District, British Burma
- Died: 14 August 1982 (aged 78) Rangoon, Burma
- Education: Dhammācariya (1941)
- Occupation: Buddhist monk
- Website: www.mahasi.org.mm

Religious life
- Religion: Buddhism
- School: Theravada
- Lineage: Mahasi
- Dharma name: Sobhana သောဘန

Senior posting
- Based in: Mahasi Monastery, Yangon, Myanmar
- Predecessor: U Nārada
- Successor: U Pandita, Dipa Ma

Mahāsī Sayādaw U Sobhana (Burmese: မဟာစည်ဆရာတော် ဦးသောဘန, pronounced [məhàsì sʰəjàdɔ̀ ʔú θɔ́bəna̰]; 29 July 1904 – 14 August 1982) was a Burmese Theravada Buddhist monk and meditation master who had a significant impact on the teaching of Vipassana (insight) meditation in the West and throughout Asia.

In his style of practice, derived from the so-called New Burmese Method of U Nārada, the meditator lives according to Buddhist morality as a prerequisite for meditation practice. Meditation itself entails the practice of "bare insight," using satipaṭṭhāna, the four foundations of mindfulness, to anchor the attention on the sensations of the rising and falling of the abdomen during breathing, observing carefully any other sensations or thoughts. This is coupled to reflection on the Buddhist teachings on causality, thereby gaining insight into anicca, dukkha, and anattā and attaining stream entry.

Mahāsī Sayādaw was a questioner and final editor at the Sixth Buddhist Council on May 17, 1954.

== Biography ==
Mahāsi Sayādaw was born in 1904 in Seikkhun village in Upper Burma. He became a novice at age twelve, and was ordained at the age of twenty with the name Sobhana. Over the course of decades of study, he passed the rigorous series of government examinations in the Theravāda Buddhist texts, gaining the newly introduced Dhammācariya (dhamma teacher) degree in 1941.

In 1931, U Sobhana took leave from teaching scriptural studies in Moulmein, South Burma, and went to nearby Thaton to practice intensive Vipassana meditation under Mingun Jetawun Sayādaw (also rendered Mingun Jetavana Sayādaw), also known as U Nārada. This teacher had practiced in the remote Sagaing Hills of Upper Burma, under the guidance of Aletawya Sayādaw, a student of the forest meditation master Thelon Sayādaw. U Sobhāna first taught Vipassana meditation in his home village in 1938, at a monastery named for its massive drum 'Mahāsi'. He became known in the region as Mahāsi Sayādaw. In 1947, the Prime Minister of Burma, U Nu, invited Mahāsi Sayādaw to be resident teacher at a newly established meditation center in Yangon, which came to be called the Mahāsi Sāsana Yeiktha.

Mahāsi Sayādaw was a questioner and final editor at the Sixth Buddhist Council on May 17, 1954. He helped establish meditation centers all over Burma as well as in Sri Lanka, Indonesia, Thailand, and by 1972 the centers under his guidance had trained more than 700,000 meditators. In 1979, he travelled to the West, holding retreats at newly founded centers such as the Insight Meditation Society (IMS) in Barre, Massachusetts, U.S. In addition, meditators came from all over the world to practice at his center in Yangon. When the Mahāsi Sayādaw died on 14 August 1982 following a massive stroke, thousands of devotees braved the torrential monsoon rains to pay their last respects.

== Practice ==
Mahāsi's method is based on the Satipaṭṭhāna Sutta, which describes how one focuses attention on the breath, noticing how one breathes in and out. Practice begins with the preparatory stage, the practice of sīla, morality, giving up worldly thoughts and desires. (Note: Jeff Wilson notes that morality is a quintessential element of Buddhist practice, and is also emphasized by the first generation of post-war western teachers. Yet, in the contemporary mindfulness movement, morality as an element of practice has been mostly discarded, 'mystifying' the origins of mindfulness.) The practitioner then engages in satipatthana by mindfulness of breathing. One pays attention to any arising mental or physical phenomena, engaging in vitakka, noting or naming physical and mental phenomena ("breathing, breathing"), without engaging the phenomenon with further conceptual thinking. By noticing the arising of physical and mental phenomena, the meditator becomes aware how sense impressions arise from the contact between the senses and physical and mental phenomena, as described in the five skandhas and paṭiccasamuppāda. This noticing is accompanied by reflections on causation and other Buddhist teachings, leading to insight into anicca, dukkha, and anattā. When the three characteristics have been comprehended, reflection subdues, and the process of noticing accelerates, noting phenomena in general, without necessarily naming them.

== Notable students ==
- Ashin Silanandabivamsa
- Sadhammaransi Sayadaw
- Sayādaw U Paṇḍita (Panditārāma)
- Chanmyay Sayādaw (U Janakabhivamsa)
- Achan Sobin S. Namto
- Nyanaponika Thera
- Anagarika Munindra
- Dipa Ma
- Ashin Jinarakkhita
- Joseph Goldstein
- Sharon Salzberg
- Jack Kornfield
- Freda Bedi
- G. V. Desani
- Pa-Auk Sayadaw

== Publications ==
Mahāsi Sayādaw published nearly seventy volumes of Buddhist literature in Burmese, many of these transcribed from talks. He completed a Burmese translation of the Visuddhimagga, ("The Path of Purification") a lengthy treatise on Buddhist practice by the 5th century Sri Lankan Theravadin Buddhist commentator and scholar Buddhaghosa. He also wrote a volume entitled Manual of Vipassana Meditation. His English works include:

- Sayadaw, Mahasi (1971). Satipatthana Vipassana Meditation.
- Sayadaw, Mahasi (1983). Thoughts on the Dhamma.
- Sayadaw, Mahasi (1986). The Ups and Downs of Rebirth.
- Sayadaw, Mahasi (1991). Practical Vipassana Exercises (PDF). Buddhist Publication Society. ISBN 978-9552400896.
- Sayadaw, Mahasi (1998). Progress of Insight: Treatise on Buddhist Satipathana Meditation. Buddhist Publication Society. ISBN 978-9552400902. Archived from the original on 2000-12-08.
- Sayadaw, Mahasi (2016). Manual of Insight. Wisdom Publications. ISBN 9781614292777.

== See also ==
- Daniel Ingram

== Sources ==
- Wilson, Jeff (2014), Mindful America: Meditation and the Mutual Transformation of Buddhism and American Culture, OUP USA
