= Sylvia Boorstein =

American author, psychotherapist, and Buddhist teacher

Sylvia Boorstein is an American author, psychotherapist, and Buddhist teacher.

Boorstein studied with Dipa Ma and is a co-founding teacher at Spirit Rock Meditation Center in Woodacre, California. She is also a senior teacher at the Insight Meditation Society in Barre, Massachusetts.

== Biography ==
All four of Boorstein's grandparents were Jewish immigrants from Eastern Europe. She grew up in Brooklyn, New York, and attended Barnard College. After moving to California in 1961, Boorstein earned a master's degree in social work from the University of California Berkeley in 1967 and a Ph.D. in Psychology from Saybrook University in 1974.

She has written numerous books such as It's Easier Than You Think: The Buddhist Way to Happiness, That's Funny, You Don't Look Buddhist, Don't Just Do Something, Sit There and Pay Attention for Goodness' Sake.
