= Dipa Ma =

Indian meditation teacher

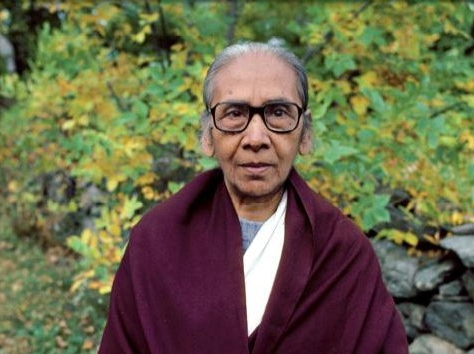
- Dipa Ma in Barre, Massachusetts, 1980
- Born: Nani Bala Barua; March 25, 1911 near Chittagong, East Bengal and Assam, British India
- Died: September 1, 1989 (aged 78); Calcutta, West Bengal, India

Academic work
- Influenced: Sylvia Boorstein, Joseph Goldstein, Jack Kornfield, Sharon Salzberg

Nani Bala Barua (25 March 1911 – 1 September 1989), better known as Dipa Ma, was an Indian meditation teacher of Theravada Buddhism and was of Barua descent. She was a prominent Buddhist master in Asia and also taught in the United States where she influenced the American branch of the Vipassana movement.

== Early life ==
Nani Bala Barua was born on 25 March 1911 in a small village in Chittagong, East Bengal, British India (now part of Bangladesh).

In her childhood she showed an exceptional interest in Buddhist rituals and preferred to study rather than play. She very much wanted to attend school but in 1923 at the age of twelve she was married and later went to live with her husband, an engineer, in Rangoon (Yangon), Burma. He soon left to work in Burma, leaving her with her in-laws. Eventually, she moved to Burma to join her husband. In 1929 when Nani was 18 her mother died unexpectedly, leaving behind a baby boy named Bijoy which Nani and her husband took to raise in Burma, as they had not yet had a child.

At the age of 35 Nani conceived and gave birth to her first child, a baby girl, who fell ill and died at three months of age. Four years later, in 1950, Nani gave birth to a daughter, Dipa, whereupon Nani began to be called Dipa Ma "Mother of Dipa" as her daughter's survival was a momentous event. This was followed by yet another loss of a child (her first son) at birth, the sudden death of her husband in 1957, and subsequent extreme grief and physical pains.

== Meditation ==
After her husband died, Dipa Ma was extremely unhappy. One day a doctor suggested that she learn how to meditate. She attended her first meditation retreat at the Kamayut Meditation Center in Rangoon. She soon after attended her second retreat, at the Thathana Yeiktha center, where the Venerable Mahasi Sayadaw was teacher-in-residence. There she experienced the first stage of enlightenment.

In 1963 she was chosen to study the siddhis (spiritual powers) with the Indian master Anagarika Munindra, a senior student of Mahasi Sayadaw. According to scholars, the Visuddhimagga is one of the extremely rare texts within the enormous literatures of various forms of Jainism, Buddhism, and Hinduism to give explicit details about how spiritual masters were thought to actually manifest supernormal abilities. Abilities such as flying through the air, walking through solid obstructions, diving into the ground, walking on water and so forth are performed by changing one element, such as earth, into another element, such as air. The individual must master kasina meditation before this is possible. Dipa Ma, who trained via the Visuddhimagga, claimed to have these abilities, but her claim was never independently verified.

== Teaching career ==
In 1967, she returned to India, moving to Calcutta where she taught meditation. Her first formal student was her neighbor, Malati Barua, a widow trying to raise six young children alone. Believing that enlightenment was possible in any environment, Dipa Ma devised practices that her new student could carry out at home.

In the 1970s, she was a teacher of Sylvia Boorstein, Joseph Goldstein, Jack Kornfield, Michelle Levey, and Sharon Salzberg, who later became prominent teachers in the United States. In the early 1980s Dipa Ma taught at the Insight Meditation Society in Barre, Massachusetts.

== Death ==
She died aged 78, in 1989 in Kolkata, India, while bowing before a statue of the Buddha.

== Sources ==
- Findly, Ellison Banks (2000), Women's Buddhism, Buddhism's Women: Tradition, Revision, Renewal, Wisdom Publications
- Knaster, Mirka Ph.D., "Living this Life Fully: The Stories and Teachings of Munindra". (2010) Shambhala Publications, Boston. ISBN 978-1-59030-674-1
- Amy Schmidt, Dipa Ma: The Life and Legacy of a Buddhist Master. ISBN 0-9742405-5-9 (USA); ISBN 1-899579-73-7 (Europe)
