= Ruth Denison =

Ruth Denison (September 29, 1922 – February 26, 2015) was the first Buddhist teacher in the United States to lead an all-women's retreat for Buddhist meditation and instruction. Her center, Dhamma Dena Desert Vipassana Center is located in the Mojave Desert, in Joshua Tree, California. She was also a teacher at the Insight Meditation Society in Barre, Massachusetts. She sometimes taught at Spirit Rock Meditation Center in Woodacre, California.

She spent her childhood and young adult years in Germany, and was later imprisoned by the invading Russian troops. She eventually immigrated to the United States. In the 1960s and 1970s, she was part of the alternative and counterculture scene.

She was one of four Westerners to receive permission to teach from Burmese master U Ba Khin, a layperson known for a particular method of awareness practice called Vipassanā, in which the meditator closely observes bodily sensations.

Denison died on February 26, 2015, after suffering a stroke. She was 92.

== Bibliography ==
- Meetings with Remarkable Women: Buddhist Teachers in America by Lenore Friedman (Boston, MA: Shambhala, Revised and Updated Edition, 2000 ISBN 1-57062-474-7)
