= Tara Brach =

American psychologist and author (born 1953)

- Born: May 15, 1953 (age 73)
- Occupations: Psychologist; author
- Known for: Buddhist teaching
- Spouse: Jonathan Foust
- Website: tarabrach.com

Tara Brach (born May 17, 1953) is an American psychologist, author, and proponent of Buddhist meditation. She is a senior teacher and founder of the Insight Meditation Community of Washington, D.C. (IMCW). Brach also teaches about Buddhist meditation at centers for meditation and yoga in the United States and Europe, including Spirit Rock Meditation Center in Woodacre, California; the Kripalu Center; and the Omega Institute for Holistic Studies.

Brach is an Engaged Buddhist, specializing in the application of Buddhist teachings and mindfulness meditation to emotional healing. She has authored several books on these subjects, including Radical Acceptance, True Refuge, and Radical Compassion.

== Biography ==
Brach was born in East Orange, New Jersey, to parents Nancy, an advertising professional, and Bill, a civil rights attorney. She was raised Christian Unitarian and is the oldest of four siblings.

She attended Clark University, earning bachelor's degrees in psychology and political science. After graduation, she joined 3HO, an organization characterizing itself as practicing Sikh Dharma, and moved into an ashram outside Boston. 3HO's leader, Yogi Bhajan, arranged her first marriage with a man she barely knew. After realizing that meditation communities were deeply affected by sexism and patriarchal norms, having spent ten years at the ashram, she left with her husband and gave birth to a son soon after. The couple divorced five years later.

Brach became a Buddhist lay priest in 1988. She taught meditation classes and was awarded a doctorate in clinical psychology from the Fielding Institute, based on her dissertation analyzing the effectiveness of meditation in the healing of eating disorders. She then began a psychotherapy practice.

In 1995, Brach, who had already been teaching meditation for over 15 years, began a Vipassana meditation group in Bethesda. By 2002, 200 people were attending the sessions. In 1998, she founded the Insight Meditation Community of Washington, D.C.

In her first book, Radical Acceptance (2003), Brach shares how Buddhist practices helped her overcome self-hatred, addiction, and chronic illness, leading her to a place of inner peace and freedom. In 2010, she launched her eponymous podcast, which by 2021 was being downloaded by 2.5 million people each month. Her second book, True Refuge, debuted on The Washington Post best-seller list the week it was released, in February 2013.

As of 2024, Brach had trained over 7,000 people to be meditation teachers. Her own meditation teachers included Joseph Goldstein and Jack Kornfield.

Brach resides in Great Falls, Virginia, with her husband, Jonathan Foust, a yoga and meditation teacher and former president of the Kripalu Center.

== Bibliography ==
=== Books and published works ===
- Brach, Tara (2003). Radical Acceptance: Embracing Your Life with the Heart of a Buddha. Bantam. ISBN 0-553-80167-8. 20th-anniversary edition: Brach, Tara (2023). Radical Acceptance: Awakening the Love That Heals Fear and Shame. Bantam. ISBN 1846047684.
- Brach, Tara (2012). "Mindful Presence: A Foundation for Compassion and Wisdom", in Wisdom and Compassion in Psychotherapy: Deepening Mindfulness in Clinical Practice edited by Christopher K. Germer and Ronald D. Siegel. Guilford Press ISBN 978-1462518869
- Brach, Tara (2013). True Refuge: Finding Peace and Freedom in Your Own Awakened Heart. Bantam. ISBN 978-0553807622.
- Brach, Tara (2014). "Healing Traumatic Fear: The Wings of Mindfulness and Love", in Mindfulness-Oriented Interventions for Trauma: Integrating Contemplative Practices edited by Follette, Briere, Rozelle, Hopper and Rome. Guilford Press ISBN 978-1462518586
- Brach, Tara (2019). Radical Compassion: Learning to Love Yourself and Your World with the Practice of RAIN. Viking. ISBN 978-0525522812.
- Brach, Tara (2021). Trusting the Gold: Uncovering Your Natural Goodness. Sounds True. ISBN 978-1-68364-713-3.

=== Audio publications ===
- Radical Self-Acceptance: A Buddhist Guide to Freeing Yourself from Shame (2005) ISBN 978-1591793212
- Radical Acceptance: Guided Meditations (2007) ISBN 978-0615185583
- Meditations for Emotional Healing (2009) ISBN 978-1591797418
- Meditation and Psychotherapy: A Professional Training Course for Integrating Mindfulness into Clinical Practice (2011) ISBN 978-1591799702
- Mindfulness Meditations: Nine Guided Practices to Awaken Presence and Open Your Heart (2012) ISBN 978-1604077988
- Finding True Refuge: Meditations for Difficult Times (2013) ISBN 978-1604078633
