= Medawi =

Burmese Theravada monk (1728–1816)

Medawi (Pali: Medhāvī; 1728–1816) was a Burmese Theravada Buddhist monk credited with being the first author of extant modern vipassanā manuals and thus may have been the first practitioner in the modern vipassana movement. Medawi's first manual dates from 1754. Medawi was highly critical of the Burmese attitude at the time, which did not see meditation as important and did not believe that enlightenment was possible at the time due to the decline of the Buddha's teachings. Most believed that the only option left was to make enough merit to be reborn in the presence of the future Buddha, Metteya. In his 1756 meditation text Nama-rupa-nibbinda Shu-bwe Medawi argues that the decline of the Buddha's "religion of practice" (paṭipatti sāsana) is individual, only to the extent that someone has given up practicing has the sasana truly declined:

Should anyone ever believe, ‘I am unable to practice even so much as is necessary to attain the path and fruit of stream-entry!’ and [on the basis of this belief] only abandon what should be abandoned… and being content with the moral purity so attained, not engage in any further practice, then for that person it can be said that the religion of practice has gone extinct.

Medawi's meditation manual focuses on the three marks of existence and the five aggregates, and cites Pali textual sources. He wrote over thirty meditation manuals. His teachings were promoted by the court of the Burmese king Bodaw-hpaya (r. 1782–1819) who gave him a title and an endowment. According to Patrick Pranke, Medawi's efforts may have been instrumental in changing the attitudes of the Burmese Sangha, making them more likely to accept the possibility that arahantship was possible through Buddhist meditation in the present era and leading to the widespread adoption of vipassana practices by monks.
