= Jack Kornfield =

American writer and Buddhist teacher

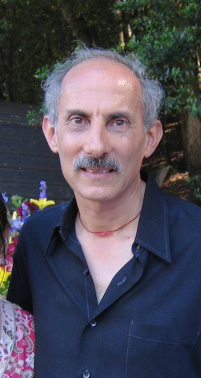
- Jack Kornfield, 2005
- Title: Vipassana Meditation Teacher

Personal life
- Born: 1945 (age 80–81) U.S.
- Spouse: Liana Kornfield (first wife, divorced), Trudy Goodman (current wife)
- Website: jackkornfield.com

Religious life
- Religion: Buddhism
- School: Theravada

Jack Kornfield (born 1945) is an American psychologist, writer, and teacher in the Vipassana movement in American Theravada Buddhism. He trained as a Buddhist monk in Thailand, Burma and India, first as a student of the Thai forest master Ajahn Chah and Mahasi Sayadaw of Burma. He has taught mindfulness meditation worldwide since 1974. In 1975, he co-founded the Insight Meditation Society in Barre, Massachusetts, with Sharon Salzberg and Joseph Goldstein, and subsequently in 1987, Spirit Rock Meditation Center in Woodacre, California. Kornfield has worked as a peacemaker and activist, organized teacher training, and led international gatherings of Buddhist teachers including the Dalai Lama.

== Biography ==
Kornfield is of Jewish descent and has three brothers. He is a fraternal twin. His father was a scientist, which brought him to an interest in healing, medicine and science. He took a course in Asian philosophy with Dr. Wing-tsit Chan. Kornfield ended up majoring in Asian studies.

After graduating from Dartmouth College in 1967, Kornfield joined the Peace Corps and was sent to Thailand where he worked on tropical medicine teams in the Mekong River valley. There he met and became a monk under the forest master Ajahn Chah, and later practiced with Mahasi Sayadaw of Burma and Dipa Ma. Kornfield returned to the United States in 1972 and in the summer of 1974, participated in the founding session of Naropa University. From the associations of this period came the Insight Meditation Society co-founded in 1975 with Sharon Salzberg and Joseph Goldstein in Barre, Massachusetts. In 1987 he co-founded Spirit Rock Meditation Center in Woodacre, California.

Kornfield has trained many of the Vipassana teachers in America, and hosted and led gatherings for Buddhist teachers together with the Dalai Lama and worldwide. He received his Ph.D. in clinical psychology from Saybrook Institute. Kornfield has written extensively on the bridge between Eastern and Western psychology.

His daughter Caroline is a graduate of Berkeley Law and practices Asylum Law. His ex-wife Liana is an artist and therapist. His wife Trudy Goodman is also a renowned meditation teacher and the founding teacher of InsightLA, which combines training in Vipassana and non-sectarian mindfulness and compassion practices, including Mindfulness-Based Stress Reduction (MBSR) and Mindful Self-Compassion (MSC).

== Teachings ==
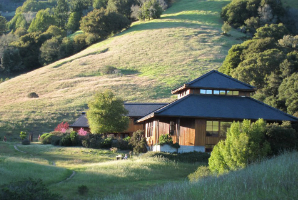
Spirit Rock Meditation Center founded by Kornfield in 1988

Kornfield has worked to make Buddhism accessible for Westerners. He has focused on combining loving kindness and self compassion with the practice of mindfulness, and incorporating together the wisdom of Eastern and Western psychology.

In Jack Kornfield's book After the Ecstasy, the Laundry, he writes about the honest development of the wise heart within the cycles of day-to-day life; for instance "amid all the Western masters and teachers I know, some idealistic perfection is not apparent. Times of great wisdom, deep compassion, and a real knowing of freedom alternate with periods of fear, confusion, neurosis, and struggle. Most teachers will readily admit this."

Kornfield was featured by Joe Frank on his radio series "The Other Side."

== Books published ==
His books include:

- Kornfield, Jack (1996) [1977]. Living Dharma: Teachings and Meditation Instructions from Twelve Theravada Masters. Shambhala Publications, Inc. ISBN 978-1-59030-832-5.
- Kornfield, Jack; Breiter, Paul (September 1, 1985). A Still Forest Pool: The Insight Meditation of Achaan Chah. Quest Books. ISBN 978-0-8356-0597-7.
- Feldman, Christina; Kornfield, Jack (1991). Stories of the Spirit, Stories of the Heart: Parables of the Spiritual Path from Around the World. HarperSanFrancisco. ISBN 978-0-06-250321-3.
- Kornfield, Jack; Fronsdal, Gil (1996) [1993]. The Teachings of the Buddha: Edited by Jack Kornfield with Gil Fronsdal. Shambhala. ISBN 1-57062-124-1.
- Kornfield, Jack (June 1993). A Path with Heart: A Guide through the Perils and Promises of Spiritual Life. Bantam Books. ISBN 978-0-553-37211-3.
- Goldstein, Joseph; Kornfield, Jack (August 29, 1995). The Path of Insight Meditation. Shambhala. ISBN 978-1-57062-069-0.
- Kornfield, Jack (October 2, 2001). After the Ecstasy, the Laundry: How the Heart Grows Wise on the Spiritual Path. Random House Publishing Group. ISBN 978-0-553-37829-0.
- Goldstein, Joseph; Kornfield, Jack (March 6, 2001). Seeking the Heart of Wisdom: The Path of Insight Meditation. Shambhala. ISBN 978-1-57062-805-4.
- Kornfield, Jack (2008) [2004]. Meditation for Beginners. Sounds True. ISBN 978-1-59179-942-9.
- Kornfield, Jack (2007) [1977]. Living Buddhist Masters / Modern Buddhist Masters. Buddhist Publication Society. ISBN 978-955-24-0042-1.
- Kornfield, Jack (May 1, 2008). The Wise Heart: A Guide to the Universal Teachings of Buddhist Psychology. Bantam Dell. ISBN 978-0-553-80347-1.
- Kornfield, Jack (2010). The Buddha is Still Teaching: Contemporary Buddhist Wisdom. Shambhala Publications, Inc. ISBN 978-1-59030-922-3.
- Kornfield, Jack (2011). Bringing Home the Dharma: Awakening Right Where You Are. Shambhala Publications, Inc. ISBN 978-1-59030-913-1.
- Kornfield, Jack (2011). A Lamp in the Darkness: Illuminating the Path Through Difficult Times. Sounds True. ISBN 978-1-60407-642-4.
- Kornfield, Jack (2017). No Time Like The Present: Finding Freedom, Love, and Joy Right Where You Are. [Atria Books, Inc. ISBN 978-1-4516-9369-0.
