= Sharon Salzberg =

American Buddhist teacher

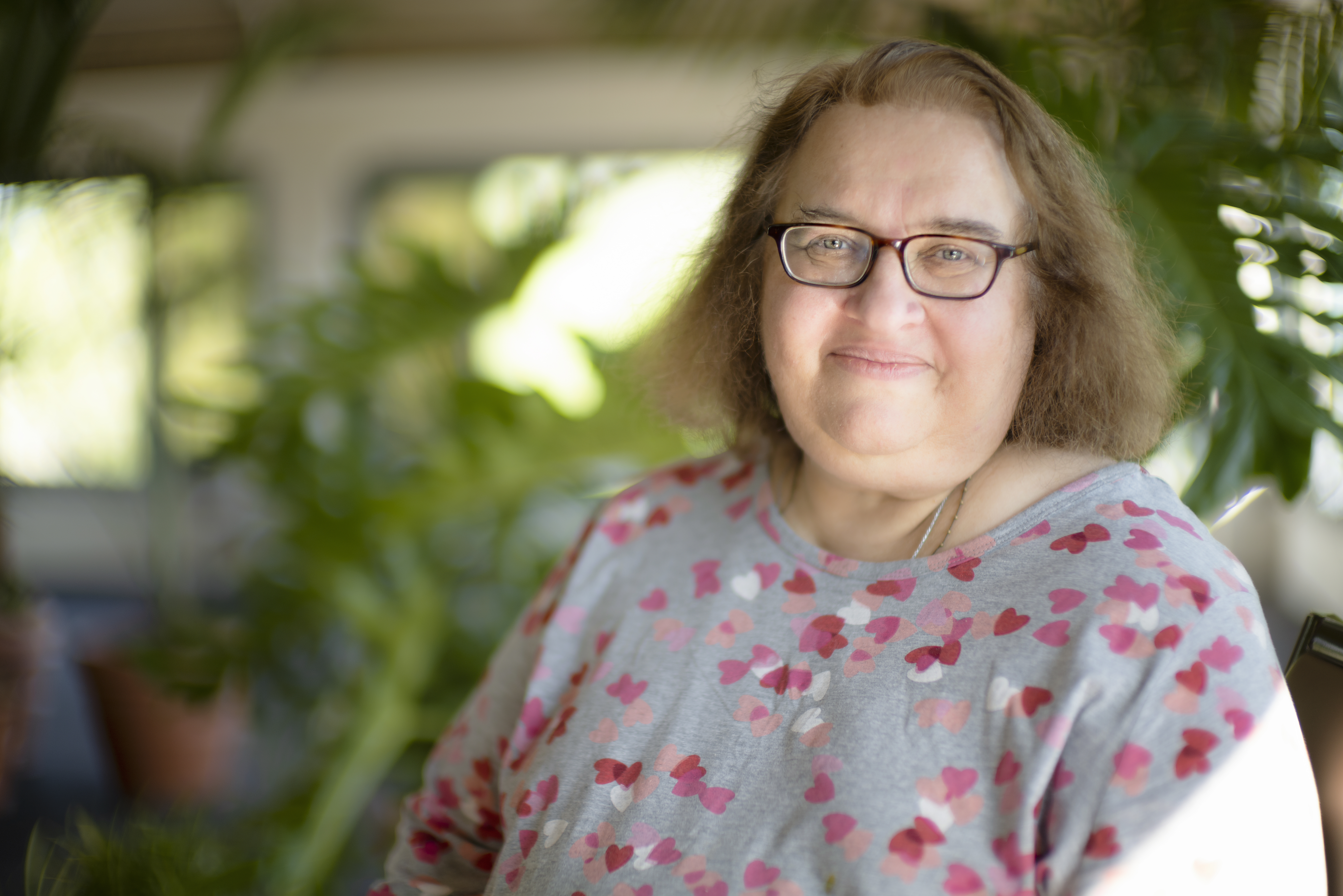
- Salzberg in 2020
- Born: August 5, 1952 (age 74); New York City
- Occupations: Author; meditation teacher
- Website: www.sharonsalzberg.com

Sharon Salzberg (born August 5, 1952) is an author and teacher of Buddhist meditation practice in the West. In 1974, she co-founded the Insight Meditation Society at Barre, Massachusetts, with Jack Kornfield and Joseph Goldstein. Her emphasis is on vipassanā (insight) and mettā (loving-kindness) methods, and she has been leading meditation retreats around the world for several decades.

All of these methods have their origins in the Theravada Buddhist tradition, through teachings by Dipa Ma, Anagarika Munindra, Sayadaw U Pandita, and other Asian teachers. Her books include Lovingkindness: The Revolutionary Art of Happiness (1995), A Heart as Wide as the World (1999), Real Happiness – The Power of Meditation: A 28-Day Program (2010), which was on The New York Times Best Seller list in 2011, the follow-up Real Happiness at Work (2013), and Love Your Enemies (co-written with Robert Thurman 2013). She runs a Metta Hour podcast, and contributes monthly to a column "On Being".

== Early life ==
Born in New York City to a Jewish family, Salzberg had a troubled early life after her parents divorced when she was four and her father abandoned the family. At nine, her mother died and she went to live with her father's parents. Though her father returned when she was eleven, he soon overdosed and was subsequently hospitalized. He was placed in the mental health system, where he remained until his death. By 16, Salzberg had lived with five different families.

In her sophomore year at the State University of New York, Buffalo in 1969, Salzberg encountered Buddhism during a course in Asian philosophy. The following year, she took an independent study trip to India, and in January 1971 attended her first intensive meditation course at Bodh Gaya. In the next several years, she engaged in intensive study with various Buddhist teachers including S.N. Goenka. After returning to US in 1974, she began teaching vipassana (insight) meditation.

== Career ==
Salzberg is a student of Dipa Ma, Anagarika Munindra, Sayadaw U Pandita and other Asian masters. She, Jack Kornfield and Joseph Goldstein founded the Insight Meditation Society at Barre, Massachusetts, in 1974. She and Goldstein co-founded the Barre Center for Buddhist Studies in 1989 and The Forest Refuge, a long-term meditation retreat center in 1998. In 1995 she published her best-known work, the metta meditation book Lovingkindness: The Revolutionary Art of Happiness. Today, she is a notable teacher of the Vipassana movement. An in-depth interview with Salzberg appears in the book Meetings with Remarkable Women: Buddhist Teachers in America, by Lenore Friedman (Boston:Shambhala, Revised and Updated edition, 2000; ISBN 1-57062-474-7)

== Honors ==
Salzberg was honored by the New York Open Center in 1999 for her "Outstanding Contribution to the Mindfulness of the West".

== Appointments ==
- Mind and Life Institute 2005 Investigating the Mind Conference, Panelist.
- Oprah Winfrey's O Magazine, Contributing Editor.
- On Being with Krista Tippett, Weekly Columnist.

== Books ==
- Lovingkindness: The Revolutionary Art of Happiness (1995) ISBN 1-59030-187-0
- A Heart as Wide as the World: Living with Mindfulness, Wisdom, and Compassion (1999) ISBN 1-57062-428-3
- Voices of Insight (2001) ISBN 1-57062-769-X
- Faith: Trusting Your Own Deepest Experience (2003) ISBN 1-57322-340-9
- The Force of Kindness: Change Your Life with Love and Compassion (2006) ISBN 1-59179-355-6
- The Kindness Handbook: A Practical Companion (2008) ISBN 978-1-59179-655-8
- Real Happiness – The Power of Meditation: A 28-Day Program (2010) ISBN 978-0-7611-5925-4
- Real Happiness at Work: Meditations for Accomplishment, Achievement, and Peace (2013) ISBN 978-0761168997
- Love Your Enemies: How to Break the Anger Habit & Be a Whole Lot Happier, with Robert Thurman (2014) ISBN 1401928153
- Real Love: The Art of Mindful Connection (2017) ISBN 978-1250076502
- Real Change: Mindfulness to Heal Ourselves and the World (2020) ISBN 978-1250310576
- Real Life: The Journey from Isolation to Openness and Freedom (2023) ISBN 978-1250835734
- Finding Your Way: Meditations, Thoughts, and Wisdom for Living an Authentic Life (2023) ISBN 978-1523516391
- Kind Karl: A Little Crocodile with Big Feelings (2025, children's book co-authored with Jason Gruhl and illustrated by Sébastien Mourrain) ISBN 978-1645472476

== Audio publications ==
- Insight Meditation: A Step-By-Step Course on How to Meditate (2002), with Joseph Goldstein ISBN 1-56455-906-8.
- Lovingkindness Meditation (2005) ISBN 1-59179-268-1
- Guided Meditations For Love & Wisdom: 14 Essential Practices (2009) ISBN 978-1-59179-707-4
- Unplug: An Interactive Kit for Giving Yourself a Break (2009) ISBN 978-1-59179-638-1

== Articles ==
- How Silence Can Help Us Unplug, huffpost.com
- How Doing Nothing Can Help You Truly Live, HuffingtonPost.com
- Meditation Practice: A Paradigm Shift, HuffingtonPost.com
- 12 Tips on Exploring Spirituality, Blogher.com
- The Benefits of Meditation, AARP.org
- Opening the Heart with Lovingkindness HuffingtonPost.com
- Buddha Nature, RebelBuddha.com
- What's Better for Creativity: Depression or Happiness?, HuffingtonPost.com

== Interviews ==
- Under the Skin with Russell Brand: Will Spirituality Solve Our Global Problems?, itunes.apple.com
- Interview with on CBS Religion & Culture, cbsnews.com.
- Audio Interview Series, BuddhistGeeks.com
- Salzberg interview with Dan Harris, ABCNews.go.com
- Interview with Elisha Goldstein, Ph.D., HuffingtonPost.com
- Yoga and Buddhism's adaptation in the West, Ascentmagazine.com
- Salzberg discusses meditation, happiness & social media with Danny Fisher, ShambhalaSun.com
- Interview, PBS Religion & Ethics Newsweekly. February 18, 2011.
- Interview, latimes.com. February 19, 2011.
- Interview, healthyyourradio.com. February 23, 2011.
