= U Pandita =

Burmese Buddhist monk

Panditarama Sayadaw ပဏ္ဍိတာရာမ ဆရာတော်
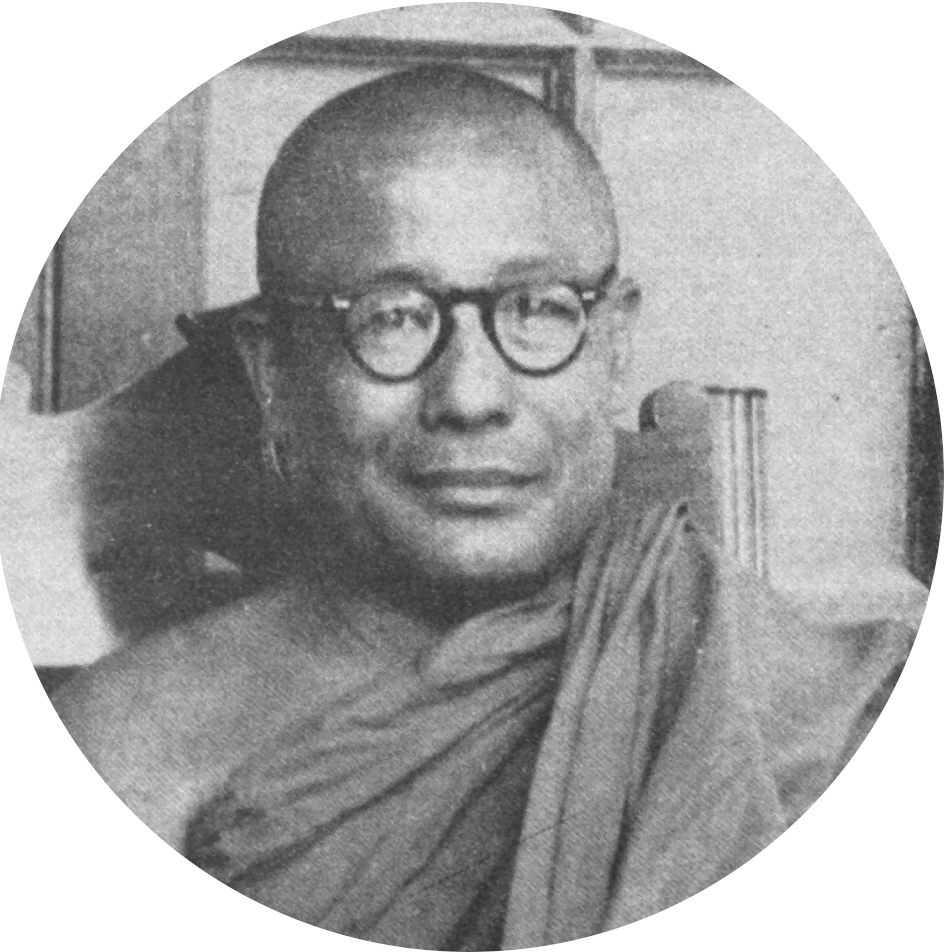
- AnisakhanSayadaw UPandita
- Title: Sayadaw

Personal life
- Born: 28 July 1921 Insein, Pegu, British Burma
- Died: 16 April 2016 (aged 94) Bangkok, Thailand
- Education: Dhammācariya (1952)
- Occupation: bhikkhu

Religious life
- Religion: Buddhism
- School: Theravada
- Lineage: Mahasi
- Dharma names: Paṇḍita ပဏ္ဍိတ

Senior posting
- Teacher: Mahasi Sayadaw
- Based in: Yangon, Myanmar
- Website: www.panditarama.net

Sayadaw U Paṇḍita (Burmese: ဆရာတော် ဦးပဏ္ဍိတ, pronounced [sʰəjàdɔ̀ ʔú pàɰ̃dḭta̰]; also Ovādācariya Sayādo Ū Paṇḍitābhivaṁsa; 28 July 1921 – 16 April 2016) was one of the foremost masters of Vipassanā. He trained in the Theravada Buddhist tradition of Myanmar. A successor to the late Mahāsi Sayādaw, he has taught many of the Western teachers and students of the Mahāsi style of Vipassanā meditation. He was the abbot of Paṇḍitārāma Meditation Center in Yangon, Myanmar.

== Early life and education ==
U Paṇḍita was born in 1921 in Insein in greater Rangoon (now Yangon) during British colonial rule. He became a novice at age twelve, and ordained at age twenty. After decades of study, he passed the rigorous series of government examinations in the Theravāda Buddhist texts, gaining the Dhammācariya (Dhamma teacher) degree in 1952.

U Paṇḍita began practicing Vipassana under the guidance of Mahāsi Sayādaw beginning in 1950.

== Career ==
In 1955, he left his position as a teacher of scriptural studies to become a meditation teacher at the Mahāsi Meditation Center. Soon after Mahasi Sayādaw died in 1982, U Paṇḍita became the guiding teacher (Ovādacariya) of the Mahasi Meditation Center. In 1991, he left that position, founding Paṇḍitārāma Meditation Center in Yangon. There are now Paṇḍitārāma branch centers in Myanmar, Nepal, Australia, Singapore, the United Kingdom and the United States.

U Paṇḍita became well known in the West after conducting a retreat in the spring of 1984 at the Insight Meditation Society (IMS) in Barre, Massachusetts in the United States. Many of the senior Western meditation teachers in the Mahāsi tradition practiced with U Paṇḍita at that and subsequent retreats. The talks he gave in 1984 at IMS were compiled as the book In This Very Life.

Until his death at age 94 in 2016, he continued to lead retreats and give Dhamma talks, but he rarely gave interviews.

== Method and style of teaching ==
U Paṇḍita was known for teaching a rigorous and precise method of self-examination. He taught Satipaṭṭhāna or Vipassanā, emphasising Buddhist ethics as a requisite foundation. He was also an erudite scholar of the Pali Tipiṭaka, the Theravāda Canon.

== Referred to by others ==
Judson Brewer a meditation researcher, uses Paṇḍita's quote to illustrate the difference between dopamine secretions and joy: "In their quest for happiness, people mistake excitement of the mind for real happiness."

== Bibliography ==
- Paṇḍitā; Aggacitta (2012). In This Very Life: Liberation Teachings of the Buddha. Wisdom Publications. ISBN 978-0-86171-880-1. Archived from the original on 2006-05-02.
- Paṇḍitā (2001). Way to the Happiness and Peace: Understanding the basics of Insight Meditation. Buddhist Publication Society.
- Paṇḍitā. Timeless Wisdom - Teachings on the Satipatthana Vipassana Meditation Practice – via vipassana.com.
- Paṇḍitā (2015). On the Path to Freedom (PDF). Createspace Independent Pub. ISBN 978-1-5088-0058-3.

== Monasteries ==
- Panditarama Shwe Taung Gon Sasana Yiktha
- Panditarama Meditation Center near Yangon (archived)
- Panditarama Lumbini International Vipassana Meditation Centre, Nepal
- Tathagata Meditation Center, San Jose, California
- Saddhamma Foundation
- Panditarama Saraniya Dhamma Meditation Centre, Manchester, England
