= U Nārada =

Burmese Buddhist monk (1868–1955)

- နာရဒ
- Title: Sayadaw

Personal life
- Born: January 16, 1868 Kangyi Kone, Salingyi Township, Myanmar
- Died: March 8, 1955 (aged 87)
- Other names: Mingun Jetawun Sayadaw; Mingun Jetavana Sayādaw
- Occupation: Buddhist monk

Religious life
- Religion: Buddhism
- School: Theravada
- Dharma name: Nārada

Senior posting
- Students: Mahasi Sayadaw, Nyanaponika Thera

U Nārada (Burmese: နာရဒ; 1868–1955), also Mingun Jetawun Sayādaw or Mingun Jetavana Sayādaw, was a Burmese monk in the Theravada tradition credited with being one of the key figures in the revival of Vipassana meditation.

His prominent students, particularly Mahasi Sayadaw, helped popularise what is now known as the "New Burmese Method" or the "Mahasi method." Sayadaw is a Burmese term of respect when addressing major Buddhist monks and means "great master".

== History ==
Monk Kun Zetawan Sayadaw was born in Kangyi Kone village, 5 Myanmar poles (approximately 10 miles) north of Sagaing, west of Min Kone, to his father U Nyo and mother Daw Paing, on Saturday, January 16, 1869, at 6:00 PM. His younger brother Maung Tha Byaw was the second of four children.

At the age of 8, he began his studies under the abbot of Sau Kei Monastery in Kangyi Kone. Due to his exceptional intelligence, he was able to understand basic scriptures even as a novice. At 14, he received the blessing of the abbot and was ordained as a novice monk with the title ""Shinnarada"". He completed the study of the Five Vinaya texts within approximately four months. During this period, his father died, and about seven months later, his mother and grandmother also died. As a result, Shinnarada left the monastic community at the age of 17 to live with and care for his younger siblings.

At the age of 20, he was ordained as a monk by U Lakkhana at the Mangye Su Towray Monastery, continuing under the name ""Shinnarada"". He studied scriptures and literature first under U Lakkhana, then under Sayadaw U Rajinda, the head monk of the three sects of Mingun Taungpawgyi Monastery. His studies took him to Moe Kaung Monastery in Mandalay, Dakkhinawun Monastery, and Mya Taung Monastery.

After spending some time at the Weluwan Monastery in Shwe Taung under Sayadaw U Rajinda, he returned to live with his teacher and undertook religious service. Later, he re-entered monastic life again and received Sayadaw U Rajinda's blessings to begin teaching. He moved to Letpadan to teach, and after about a year, took residence under Sayadaw Alay Towra Mingun to deepen his meditation practice.

From the age of 37, he engaged in three years of intensive meditative discipline (referred to as "the path of the path"). At 40, he moved to Myo Hla to further promote this path, and then to Thaton where he established the Mingun Jetawan Monastery. After over a decade in Thaton, he returned to the original Mingun Gu Lay Chaung Monastery, but later went back to Thaton at the request of his disciples. He remained there for the rest of his life, dedicating himself to Dhamma teaching.

Monk Kun Sayadaw died on the 10th day of the waning moon of Tabaung in 1316 ME (March 8, 1955), at the age of 86. In addition to his teachings, he authored and compiled 23 books.

== Creation of the New Burmese Method ==
Nyanaponika Thera, himself a student of Mahasi Sayadaw, describes the manner in which U Nārada developed the New Burmese Method:

It was at the beginning of this century that a Burmese monk, U Nārada by name, bent on actual realization of the teachings he had learnt, was eagerly searching for a system of meditation offering a direct access to the Highest Goal, without encumbrance by accessories. Wandering through the country, he met many who were given to strict meditative practice, but he could not obtain guidance satisfactory to him. In the course of his quest, coming to the famous meditation-caves in the hills of Sagaing in Upper Burma, he met a monk who was reputed to have entered upon those lofty Paths of Sanctitude (ariya-magga) where the final achievement of Liberation is assured. When the Venerable U Nārada put his question to him, he was asked in return: 'Why are you searching outside of the Master's word? Has not the Only Way, Satipaṭṭhāna, been proclaimed by Him?'
U Nārada took up this indication. Studying again the text and its traditional exposition, reflecting deeply on it, and entering energetically upon its practice, he finally came to understand its salient features. The results achieved in his own practice convinced him that he had found what he was searching for: a clear-cut and effective method of training the mind for highest realization. From his own experience he developed the principles and the details of the practice which formed the basis for those who followed him as his direct or indirect disciples. In order to give a name to the Venerable U Nārada's method of training in which the principles of Sattipaṭṭhāna are applied in such a definite and radical way, we propose to call it here the Burmese Sattipaṭṭhāna Method; not in the sense that it was a Burmese invention but because it was in Burma that the practice of that ancient Way had been so ably and energetically revived.

== Books compiled by him ==
1. Petakopa Veda Atthakathapatha.
2. Petakopa Veda Nistha First, Second, Third Volumes.
3. Sajjeta Vidhi Vissajjana.
4. Asha Vidhi Vissajjana.
5. Visuddhi Magga Atthakatha Nistha New.
6. Forty Forests Opened.
7. Milinda Panya Atthakathapatha.
8. Nibbana Katha (Prose)
9. Nibbana Guide Discourse.
10. Nibbana Treatise.
11. Satipatthana Treatise.
12. Satipaisa Yekhao Vinicsayasamuha.
13. Kathina Vinicsayasa (Prose).
14. Kathina Nistha.
15. Phala Sama Pata.
16. Maha Salayatana Sutta Nistha.
17. Mula Pariyaya Sutta Nistha.
18. Padapadaraha Vinicya.
19. Patinyata Karana Vinicya.
20. Theinchant.
21. The Great Book of Vipassana Insight.
22. On the Essence of the Mind.
23. On the Way of the Atirit.

Mingun Sayadaw is also called Myohla Monk and Mula Mingun Jetavan Sayadaw, and his disciples call him Arahant.
