= Gil Fronsdal =

American Buddhist teacher

Personal life
- Born: 1954 (age 71–72)

Religious life
- Religion: Theravāda Buddhism
- School: Sōtō Zen
- Website: Insight Meditation Center

Gil Fronsdal (born 1954) is a Norwegian-born, American Buddhist teacher, writer and scholar based in Redwood City, California. He has been practicing Buddhism of the Sōtō Zen and Vipassanā sects since 1975, and is currently teaching the practice of Buddhism in the San Francisco Bay Area. Having been taught by the Vipassanā practitioner Jack Kornfield, Fronsdal is part of the Vipassanā teachers' collective at Spirit Rock Meditation Center. He was ordained as a Sōtō Zen priest at the San Francisco Zen Center in 1982, and was a Theravāda monk in Burma in 1985. In 1995, he received Dharma transmission from Mel Weitsman, the abbot of the Berkeley Zen Center.

He is the guiding teacher of the Insight Meditation Center (IMC) of Redwood City. He has a PhD in Buddhist Studies from Stanford University. His many dharma talks available online contain basic information on meditation and Buddhism, as well as subtle concepts of Buddhism explained at the level of the lay person.

Fronsdal has been credited with identifying "what is perhaps the basic formula of success for any Buddhist group in America: 'spiritual' practice (that is, meditation) removed from Asian cultural expressions". Fronsdal has also been noted for his "analysis of the transformed role of sila (morality) in the western Insight Meditation Movement" and his view that the popularity of vipassana meditation in middle-class America is related to its message of "orthopraxy" (right action) and its lack of cultural and historical "baggage". His work has also been cited as a means by which First Nations people might "change the reality of internalized oppression to the reality of peace" while his 2005 translation of the Dhammapada has been included in a suggested reading list for teaching college students about happiness.

In a 2011 discussion of the meaning of mindfulness, the American Theravada Buddhist monk Bhikkhu Bodhi cited Fronsdal in the following passage as "neatly" summarizing the difference between traditional Buddhist practice and that being taught in the West:

Rather than stressing world-renunciation, they [Western lay teachers] stress engagement with, and freedom within the world. Rather than rejecting the body, these Western teachers embrace the body as part of the holistic field of practice. Rather than stressing ultimate spiritual goals such as full enlightenment, ending the cycles of rebirth, or attaining the various stages of sainthood, many Western teachers tend to stress the immediate benefits of mindfulness and untroubled, equanimous presence in the midst of life’s vicissitudes.

This approach has been described as having traditional forms of Buddhism "being expanded upon rather than rejected", with Fronsdal cited as calling on Vipassana teachers "to study traditional Buddhism, not in order to adopt it wholesale but to be more conscious about what is and is not adopted and to take more responsibility for assumptions and intentions underlying innovation". As such, Fronsdal is recognized as presenting meditation as "the heart of the Buddhist path" with the traditional Buddhist values of loving-kindness, ethics, and generosity as key elements in a mindfulness-based, spiritual life among practitioners who are more likely to describe their involvement as "spiritual" rather than "religious".

In 2008 Peter Dale Scott, the Canadian-born poet and professor emeritus of English at the University of California, Berkeley, published a poem dedicated to Fronsdal entitled Breathing exercise: a how-to poem.

== Publications ==
- Fronsdal, Gil (2016), The Buddha before Buddhism: Wisdom from the Early Teachings, Shambhala Publications, ISBN 978-9386867292
- Fronsdal, Gil (2010), A Monastery Within: Tales from the Buddhist Path, Tranquil Books, ISBN 978-0-9845092-1-8
- Fronsdal, Gil (2005), The Dhammapada: A New Translation of the Buddhist Classic with Annotations, Shambhala Publications, ISBN 1-59030-211-7
- Fronsdal, Gil (2002), "Virtues without Rules", in Prebish, C.S.; Baumann, Martin (eds.), Westward Dharma: Buddhism Beyond Asia, University of California Press, ISBN 978-0520226258
- Fronsdal, Gil (2001), The Issue at Hand", Essays on Buddhist Mindfulness Practice
- Fronsdal, Gil (1998), "Insight Meditation in the United States: Life, Liberty, and the Pursuit of Happiness", in Prebish, C.S.; Tanaka, K.K. (eds.), The Faces of Buddhism in America, University of California Press
- Fronsdal, Egil (1998), The dawn of the bodhisattva path: Studies in a religious ideal of ancient Indian Buddhists with particular emphasis on the earliest extant Perfection of Wisdom Sūtra" (Ph.D. thesis), Stanford University, archived from the original on 2011-07-19
- Fronsdal, Gil; Van House, Nancy (1996), Voices from Spirit Rock: Talks on Mindfulness Practice, Clear & Present Graphics
- Fronsdal, Gil; Kornfield, Jack (1996), Teachings of the Buddha, Shambhala Publications, ISBN 1-57062-124-1
