= Barre Center for Buddhist Studies =

Center for Buddhist studies in Massachusetts, USA

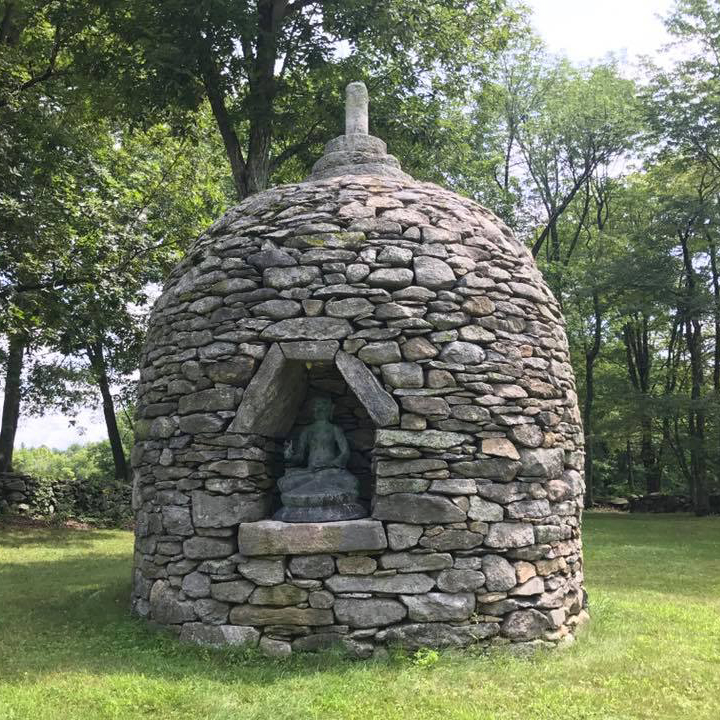
The Stone Stupa at BCBS contains a relic of Sariputta

The Barre Center for Buddhist Studies (BCBS) was founded in 1990 by Joseph Goldstein and Sharon Salzberg. It was founded as a complement to the nearby Insight Meditation Society retreat center, and operates as an independent educational nonprofit organization.

BCBS hosts many visiting meditation teachers and academic faculty, including Joanna Macy, Charles Hallisey, Gregory Kramer, Thanissaro Bhikkhu, Stephen Batchelor, and more. Respected author Bhikkhu Analayo currently resides full time on the Barre campus as the resident scholar monk.

BCBS has become an established center for Buddhist Studies in America, and is on the forefront of internal dharma movements including Ecodharma and Socially Engaged Buddhism.
