= Anagarika Munindra =

Indian Buddhist leader

- Title: Vipassana meditation teacher

Personal life
- Born: 1915 Chittagong, Bengal Presidency, British India (now part of Bangladesh)
- Died: 2003 (aged 87–88) Igatpuri, Maharashtra, India
- Occupation: Religious leader

Religious life
- Religion: Buddhism
- School: Theravada

Senior posting
- Teacher: S. N. Goenka, Mahasi Sayadaw
- Students: Dipa Ma

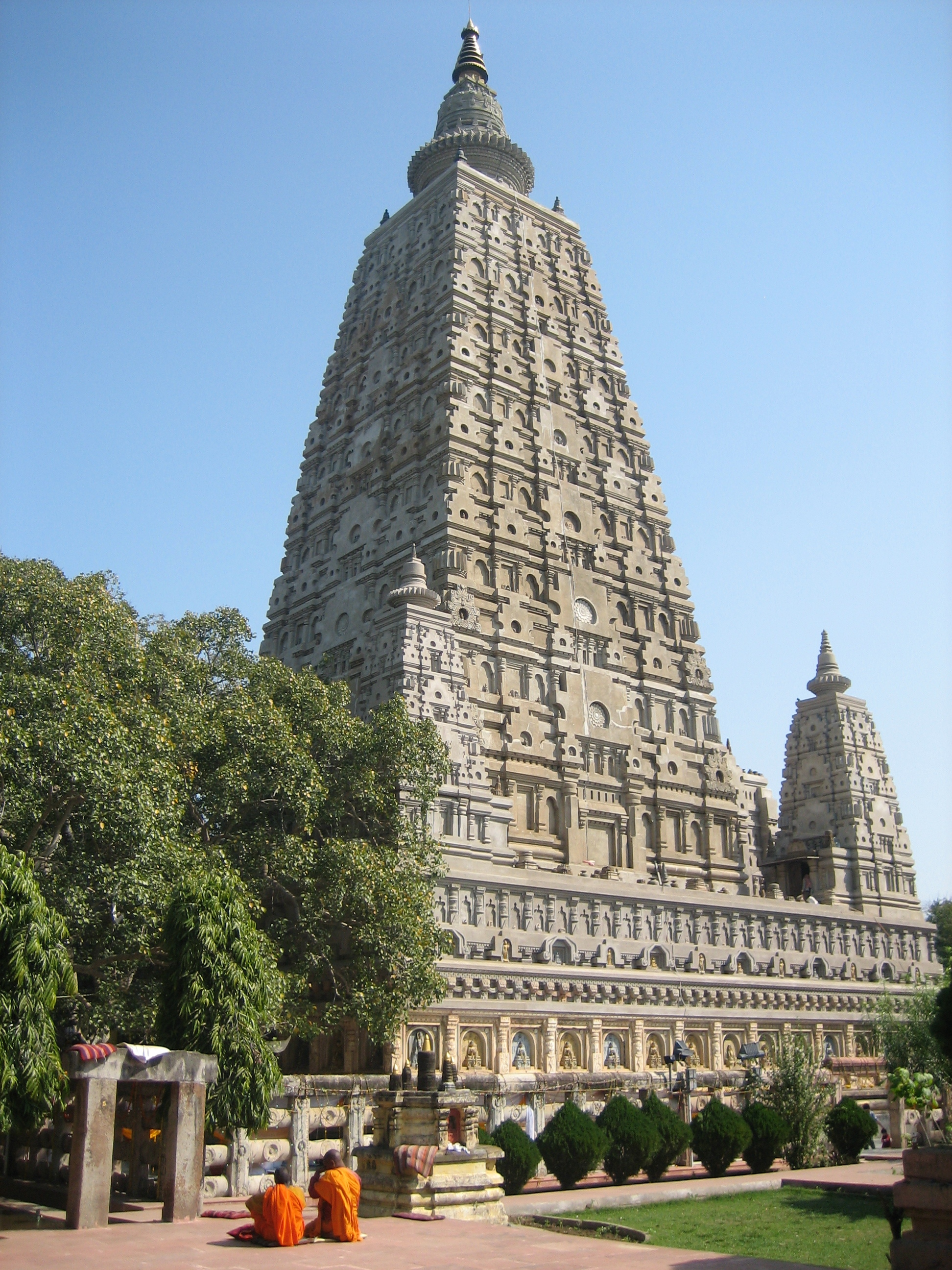
Mahabodhi temple in Bodhgaya, India

Anagarika Shri Munindra (1915 – October 14, 2003), also called Munindraji by his disciples, was an Indian Vipassanā meditation teacher, who taught many notable meditation teachers including Dipa Ma, Joseph Goldstein, and Sharon Salzberg. Anagarika simply means a practicing Buddhist who leads a nomadic life without attachment in order to focus on the Dhamma.

== Early life ==
Anagarika was born in Chittagong, British India (what is now Bangladesh) and descended from Buddhists of India forced east by the eleventh century Muslim invasion.

== Buddhist life ==
He was an active member of the Maha Bodhi Society whose purpose was the resuscitation of Buddhism in India and the restoration of ancient Buddhist shrines there. Munindra was the superintendent of the Mahabodhi Temple at Bodh Gaya from 1953 to 1957, the first Buddhist to hold this position in modern times. From 1957 to 1966 he lived in Burma, where he was a close disciple of Mahasi Sayadaw, who authorised him to teach Vipassana meditation. While in Burma he also studied the Pāli Canon thoroughly, before returning to India, where he taught Vipassana for many years in Bodh Gaya. He was known to be very open-minded and relaxed in the way he taught. He would encourage his students to study with other teachers, and investigate other traditions.

== In the tradition of Ledi Sayadaw ==
During his stay in Burma he came in close contact with S. N. Goenka and had Dhamma discussions with him. Subsequently, he wished to learn Vipassana from Sayagyi U Ba Khin but since he had already learnt Vipassana from a monk, Sayagyi expressed his inability to teach him Vipassana in the tradition of Ledi Sayadaw.

Finally, his wish was fulfilled a few years later when S. N. Goenka started teaching Vipassana in India. Munindra joined a 10-day course conducted by Goenka at Bodhgaya. He was very impressed by the technique, as expressed in a letter of appreciation that he wrote to Sayagyi U Ba Khin after the course.

== Final years ==
He spent the last part of his life living at the Vipassana Research Institute's main meditation centre, Dhamma Giri, at the village of Igatpuri, India, as a guest of his close friend S. N. Goenka.
