= Joseph Goldstein (writer) =

American Vipassana teacher

- Born: May 20, 1944 (age 82)
- Education: Columbia University
- Occupations: Writer; Meditation teacher
- Known for: Co-founder, Insight Meditation Society

Joseph Goldstein (born May 20, 1944) is one of the first American vipassana teachers, co-founder of the Insight Meditation Society (IMS) with Jack Kornfield and Sharon Salzberg, a contemporary author of numerous popular books on Buddhism (see publications below), a resident guiding teacher at IMS, and a leader of retreats worldwide on insight (vipassana) and lovingkindness (metta) meditation. An early promoter of insight practice and awareness, Goldstein is credited as an influence in the rise of mindfulness practices in the US since he started hosting workshops in 1974 (see Chronology section).

While the majority of Goldstein's publications introduce Westerners to primarily Theravada concepts, practices and values, his 2002 work, One Dharma, explored the creation of an integrated framework for the Theravada, Tibetan and Zen traditions.

== Chronology ==
- May 20, 1944: Born; grew up in the Catskill Mountains of New York.
- 1965: Graduated from Columbia University as a philosophy major.
- 1965: Entered the Peace Corps in Thailand, where he first became interested in Buddhism. After the Peace Corps, he spent most of the next seven years in India studying and practicing Buddhist meditation. In Bodh Gaya India, Goldstein studied Theravada Buddhism with Anagarika Sri Munindra.
- 1974: He began teaching at Chogyam Trungpa's Naropa Institute in Boulder, Colorado. It was at the Naropa Institue where he met Jack Kornfield and together they designed and led multiple successful courses . He has been leading vipassana and metta retreats worldwide since 1974.
- 1975: Co-founded the IMS in Barre, Massachusetts with Jack Kornfield and Sharon Salzberg.
- 1991: Helped establish the Barre Center for Buddhist Studies.
- 1998: Co-founded the IMS Forest Refuge for long-term personal retreats.
- 2015: Started the "Insight Hour with Joseph Goldstein" podcast on the Be Here Now Network.

== Meditation practice ==
Goldstein had original experiences of realisation concerning the word 'unborn' and an experience of zero and of no self. He makes a 3-month meditation retreat most years. He says the peace and happiness we experience has to do with the quality of our minds, not our possessions. His book Mindfulness is based on the Satipatthana Sutta, a Buddhist text. Goldstein has featured talks and sessions available on the Insight Meditation Society (IMS) website.

== Teachers and Relationships ==
Since 1967, Goldstein has practiced different forms of Buddhist meditation under well-known teachers from India, Burma and Tibet. His teachers include: Anagarika Sri Munindra, Sri S.N. Goenka, Mrs. Nani Bala Barua (Dipa Ma), the Venerable Sayadaw U Pandita, Tulku Urgyen Rinpoche, and Nyoshul Khenpo Rinpoche.

Goldstein's personal and working relationship to Jack Kornfield is often referenced in scholarship. They are compared as parallels, both of them grew up on the east coast, earned Ivy league educations, went to the peace corps in southeast Asia in the 1965 and began to study Theravada Buddhism in the late 60s and early 70s - Goldstein in India, Kornfield in Thailand. Their collaboration with making Vispanna intelligible and accessible through the IMS is viewed as an important propagator of Buddhism and mindfulness practice in the West.

== Publications (partial list, in chronological order) ==
- The Experience of Insight: A Simple and Direct Guide to Buddhist Meditation (1976)
- Goldstein, Joseph; Kornfield, Jack (1987). Seeking the heart of wisdom: the path of insight meditation. Shambhala. ISBN 978-1-57062-805-4.
- Goldstein, Joseph. Insight meditation: the practice of freedom. Shambhala. ISBN 978-1-57062-025-6.
- Goldstein, Joseph; Kornfield, Jack (1995). The Path of Insight Meditation. Shambhala. ISBN 978-1-57062-069-0.
- Insight Meditation: A Step-By-Step Course on How to Meditate (2002), with Sharon Salzberg
- One Dharma: The Emerging Western Buddhism (2002)
- A Heart Full of Peace (2007)
- Goldstein, Joseph (November 2013). Mindfulness: A Practical Guide to Awakening. Sounds True. ISBN 978-1-62203-063-7.
