= Insight Meditation Society =

Buddhist organization in Barre, Massachusetts

The Insight Meditation Society (IMS) is a non-profit organization for study of Buddhism located in Barre, Massachusetts. It was founded in 1975 by Sharon Salzberg, Jack Kornfield, Joseph Goldstein and Jacqueline Schwartz, and is rooted in the Theravada tradition. Its first retreat center in an old mansion in Barre, Massachusetts was opened on February 14, 1976.

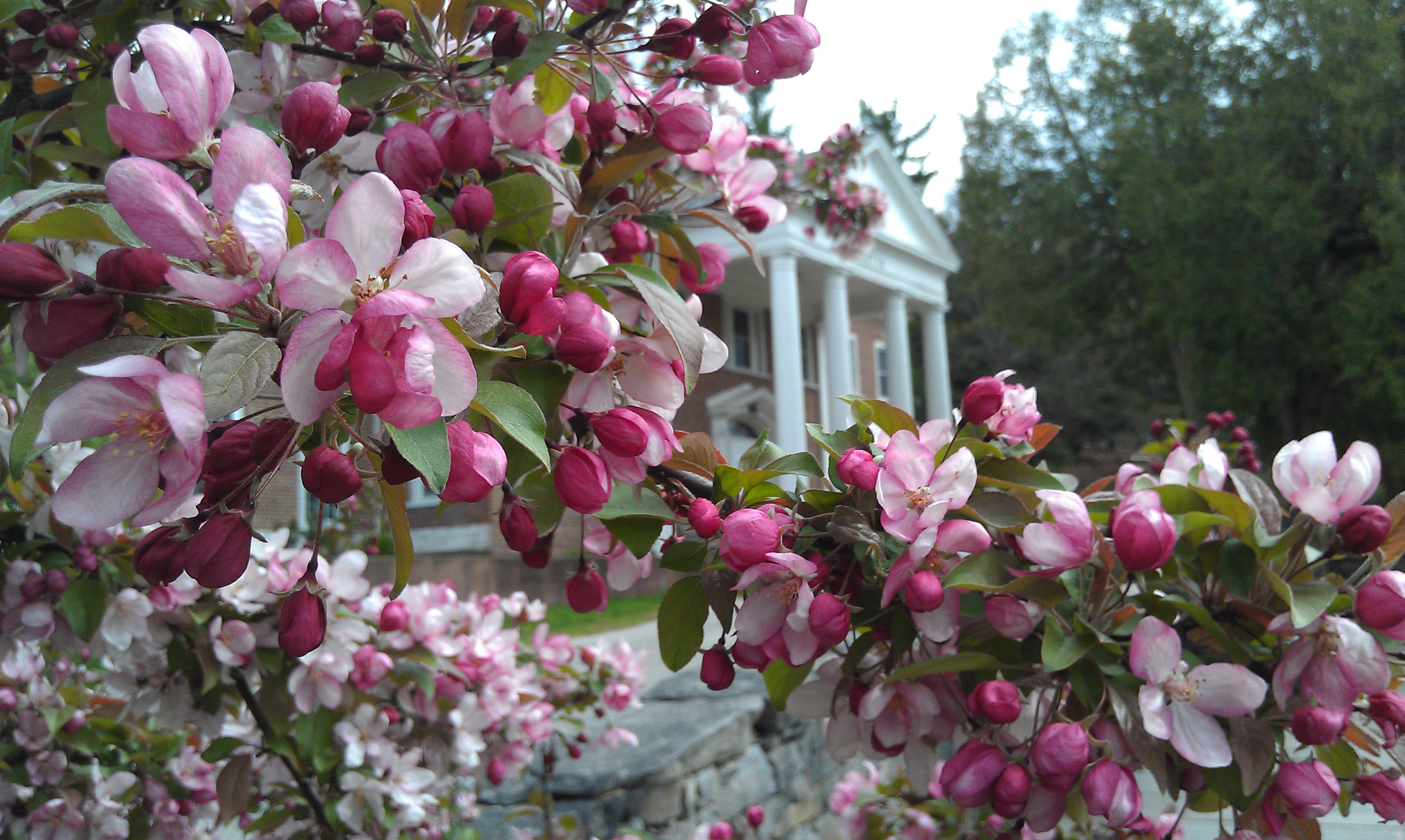
Insight Meditation Society, in Barre, Massachusetts in the backdrop amidst blossoming trees.

== Overview ==
IMS offers Buddhist meditation retreats at two facilities – the Retreat Center and The Forest Refuge – in rural central Massachusetts. Both centers teach vipassanā meditation. In 1990, a closely related but independent educational center, the Barre Center for Buddhist Studies, was founded by Joseph Goldstein and Sharon Salzberg on land adjoining IMS.

From 1996-2006, IMS offered a correspondence course developed by its founders Joseph Goldstein and Sharon Salzberg entitled Insight Meditation which consisted of 12 audio cassettes and a workbook. The course later evolved into Insight Meditation: An In-Depth Correspondence Course, with 24 audio CDs and an 88-page workbook.

== Teachings ==
When a Retreat Center course is in progress, anyone who is not already participating in the retreat is welcome to attend the evening talks about the teachings, known as dharma talks. Those with insight meditation experience are also welcome to attend group sittings." Dharma talks are available for free download, a service provided by Dharma Seed.
