= Barre, Massachusetts =

- Town
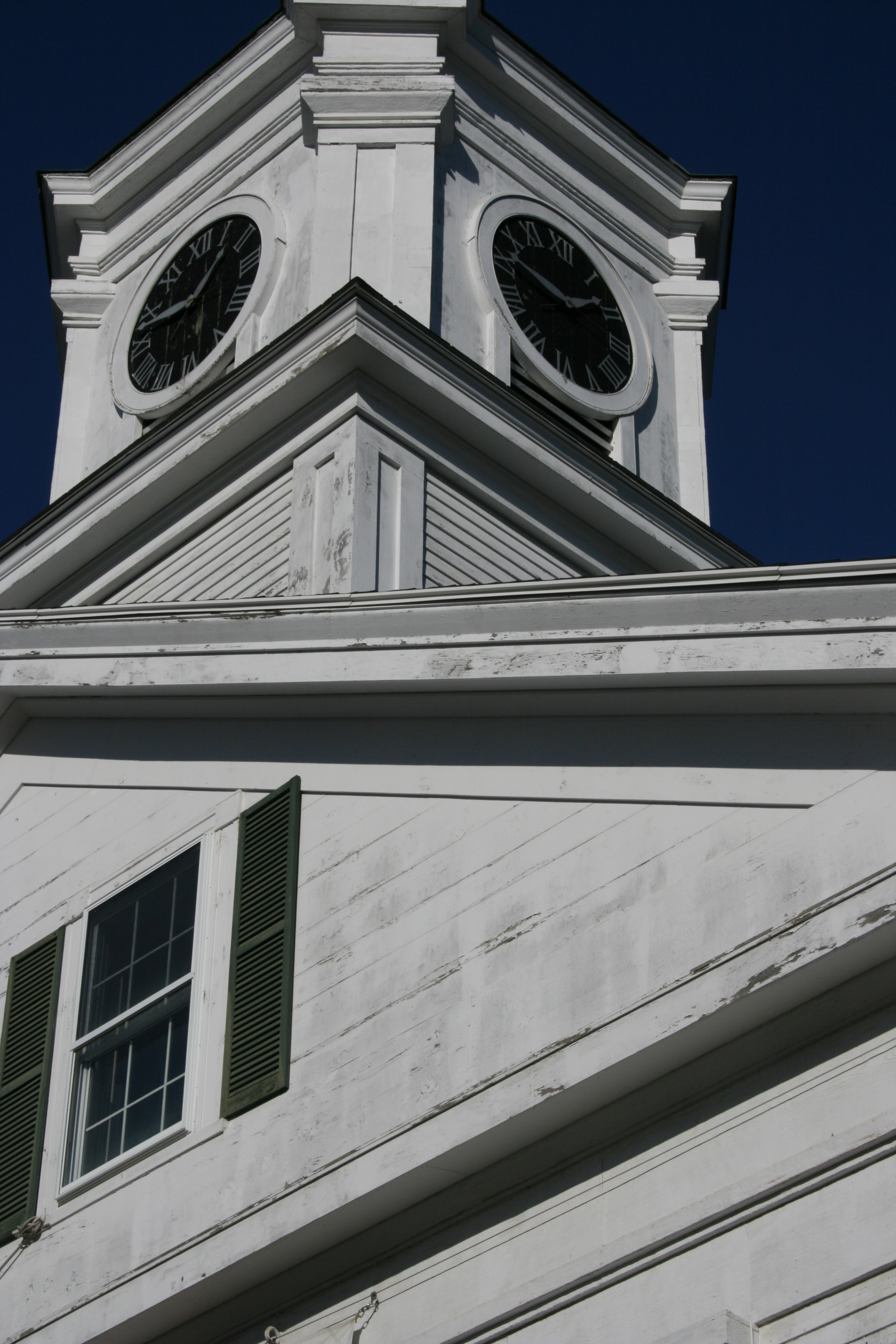
- Barre Town Hall

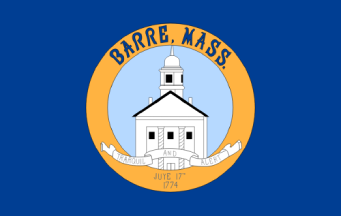
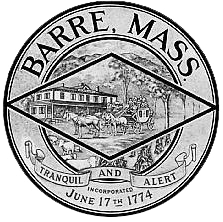
- Flag Seal
- Motto: "Tranquil and Alert"
- Location in Worcester County and the state of Massachusetts.
- Coordinates: 42°25′22″N 72°06′20″W
- Country: United States
- State: Massachusetts
- County: Worcester
- Settled: 1720
- Incorporated: 1774

Government
  - Type: Open town meeting
  - Town Administrator: Jessica Sizer

Area
  - Total: 44.6 sq mi (115.5 km^{2})
  - Land: 44.3 sq mi (114.8 km^{2})
  - Water: 0.27 sq mi (0.7 km^{2})
- Elevation: 890 ft (270 m)

Population (2020)
  - Total: 5,530
  - Density: 125/sq mi (48.2/km^{2})
- Time zone: UTC−5 (Eastern)
  - Summer (DST): UTC−4 (Eastern)
- ZIP Codes: 01005 (Barre); 01068 (Oakham); 01074 (South Barre)
- Area codes: 351/978
- FIPS code: 25-03740
- GNIS feature ID: 0619475
- Website: www.townofbarre.com

Barre (/ˈbæri/ BARR-ee) is a town in Worcester County, Massachusetts, United States. The population was 5,530 at the 2020 census. It contains the census-designated place of the same name.

== History ==
Originally called the Northwest District of Rutland, it was first settled by Europeans in 1720. The town was incorporated as a district on June 17, 1774, as Hutchinson after Thomas Hutchinson, colonial governor of Massachusetts. Eventually, along with 41 other districts in the state, they were all incorporated on August 23, 1775, by the Massachusetts Court. The next year on November 7, 1776, it was renamed Barre in honor of Colonel Isaac Barré, an Irish-born MP who was a champion of American Independence. "This township was originally known as Rutland, West District; but prior to 1770 its name was changed to "Hutchinson", in honor of the Hon. Thomas Hutchinson who was Lieutenant Governor of Massachusetts in 1765, became acting Governor in 1769, and Governor in 1770. When, in 1774, on account of his Tory proclivities, Governor Hutchinson resigned his office and went to England, his name and memory were so execrated by the patriots of the township of Hutchinson that, in 1776, the General Assembly of Massachusetts changed the name of the township to "Barré."

In 1849 the Boston, Barre and Gardner Railroad was founded to build a railroad from Worcester to Barre, but it failed to raise enough capital to start construction. The project was revived in 1869, but it was re-routed to run between Worcester and Gardner, bypassing Barre. When the line opened in 1871 it was still called the Boston, Barre and Gardner RR, although it never reached Barre. The line's nearest depot to Barre was at Hubbardston, 7 miles (11 km) away.

On April 11, 1943, Barre held a civic welcome for Basil Izzi, a local man who was a United States Navy Armed Guard and had recently survived 83 days in the Atlantic Ocean on a life raft after his ship, the Zaandam, was torpedoed. In 1988 the Barre Gazette claimed that the welcoming parade in his honor was "still the longest parade on record in the Commonwealth". Izzi died in 1979. On May 28, 2015, a road bridge near South Barre was renamed the "Seaman 2nd Class Basil D. Izzi Memorial Bridge" in his honor. The bridge carries Massachusetts Route 32 over the Ware River.

== Geography ==
According to the United States Census Bureau, the town has a total area of 44.6 square miles (116 km^{2}), of which 44.3 square miles (115 km^{2}) is land and 0.3 square miles (0.78 km^{2}), or 0.63%, is water. Barre is drained by the Ware River.

Barre is bordered by Hubbardston to the northeast, Rutland and Oakham to the southeast, New Braintree to the south, Hardwick to the southwest, Petersham to the northwest, and a small portion of Phillipston to the north.

Barre includes the Mass Central Rail Trail: New Braintree to Barre Plains and Mass Central Rail Trail: Barre, Oakham, and Rutland, sections of a partially completed shared-use rail trail extending across Massachusetts between Northampton and Boston.

=== Climate ===
Climate data for Barre (Barre Dam Falls), Massachusetts (1991–2020 normals, extremes 1959–present)
| Month | Jan | Feb | Mar | Apr | May | Jun | Jul | Aug | Sep | Oct | Nov | Dec | Year |
|---|---|---|---|---|---|---|---|---|---|---|---|---|---|
| Record high °F (°C) | 67 (19) | 76 (24) | 81 (27) | 96 (36) | 97 (36) | 103 (39) | 103 (39) | 100 (38) | 95 (35) | 85 (29) | 77 (25) | 69 (21) | 103 (39) |
| Mean maximum °F (°C) | 53.5 (11.9) | 54.2 (12.3) | 64.7 (18.2) | 79.7 (26.5) | 87.0 (30.6) | 89.9 (32.2) | 91.5 (33.1) | 89.1 (31.7) | 86.2 (30.1) | 75.4 (24.1) | 66.4 (19.1) | 56.6 (13.7) | 93.2 (34.0) |
| Mean daily maximum °F (°C) | 34.5 (1.4) | 37.7 (3.2) | 45.7 (7.6) | 59.1 (15.1) | 69.8 (21.0) | 78.2 (25.7) | 83.2 (28.4) | 81.3 (27.4) | 74.5 (23.6) | 62.0 (16.7) | 49.9 (9.9) | 39.8 (4.3) | 59.6 (15.3) |
| Daily mean °F (°C) | 23.7 (−4.6) | 25.6 (−3.6) | 33.7 (0.9) | 45.5 (7.5) | 56.4 (13.6) | 65.2 (18.4) | 70.4 (21.3) | 68.1 (20.1) | 61.0 (16.1) | 48.9 (9.4) | 38.6 (3.7) | 29.6 (−1.3) | 47.2 (8.4) |
| Mean daily minimum °F (°C) | 12.8 (−10.7) | 13.6 (−10.2) | 21.7 (−5.7) | 32.0 (0.0) | 43.0 (6.1) | 52.2 (11.2) | 57.7 (14.3) | 54.9 (12.7) | 47.6 (8.7) | 35.9 (2.2) | 27.4 (−2.6) | 19.4 (−7.0) | 34.8 (1.6) |
| Mean minimum °F (°C) | −7.7 (−22.1) | −5.6 (−20.9) | 3.0 (−16.1) | 19.8 (−6.8) | 27.9 (−2.3) | 37.0 (2.8) | 44.9 (7.2) | 42.1 (5.6) | 31.3 (−0.4) | 22.0 (−5.6) | 13.7 (−10.2) | 1.3 (−17.1) | −11.2 (−24.0) |
| Record low °F (°C) | −25 (−32) | −22 (−30) | −16 (−27) | 4 (−16) | 21 (−6) | 25 (−4) | 34 (1) | 28 (−2) | 24 (−4) | 12 (−11) | −7 (−22) | −16 (−27) | −25 (−32) |
| Average precipitation inches (mm) | 3.51 (89) | 2.97 (75) | 3.61 (92) | 3.90 (99) | 3.68 (93) | 4.21 (107) | 4.09 (104) | 4.51 (115) | 4.37 (111) | 4.86 (123) | 3.67 (93) | 4.33 (110) | 47.71 (1,211) |
| Average snowfall inches (cm) | 13.6 (35) | 14.9 (38) | 12.2 (31) | 3.5 (8.9) | 0.0 (0.0) | 0.0 (0.0) | 0.0 (0.0) | 0.0 (0.0) | 0.0 (0.0) | 0.2 (0.51) | 2.9 (7.4) | 13.1 (33) | 60.4 (153.81) |
| Average extreme snow depth inches (cm) | 9.3 (24) | 11.2 (28) | 9.5 (24) | 3.0 (7.6) | 0.0 (0.0) | 0.0 (0.0) | 0.0 (0.0) | 0.0 (0.0) | 0.0 (0.0) | 0.3 (0.76) | 2.0 (5.1) | 7.6 (19) | 15.6 (40) |
| Average precipitation days (≥ 0.01 in) | 12.8 | 10.2 | 11.5 | 12.4 | 13.9 | 12.8 | 11.5 | 10.7 | 10.1 | 11.8 | 11.1 | 12.5 | 141.3 |
| Average snowy days (≥ 0.1 in) | 6.7 | 6.1 | 4.7 | 1.0 | 0.1 | 0.0 | 0.0 | 0.0 | 0.0 | 0.1 | 1.5 | 4.9 | 25.1 |
Source 1: NOAA
Source 2: National Weather Service

== Demographics ==
Historical population
| Year | Pop. | ±% |
|---|---|---|
| 1790 | 1,613 | — |
| 1850 | 2,976 | +84.5% |
| 1860 | 2,973 | −0.1% |
| 1870 | 2,572 | −13.5% |
| 1880 | 2,419 | −5.9% |
| 1890 | 2,239 | −7.4% |
| 1900 | 2,059 | −8.0% |
| 1910 | 2,957 | +43.6% |
| 1920 | 3,357 | +13.5% |
| 1930 | 3,510 | +4.6% |
| 1940 | 3,528 | +0.5% |
| 1950 | 3,406 | −3.5% |
| 1960 | 3,479 | +2.1% |
| 1970 | 3,825 | +9.9% |
| 1980 | 4,102 | +7.2% |
| 1990 | 4,546 | +10.8% |
| 2000 | 5,113 | +12.5% |
| 2010 | 5,398 | +5.6% |
| 2020 | 5,530 | +2.4% |
| 2022* | 5,533 | +0.1% |
* = population estimate. Source: United States census records and Population Estimates Program data.

As of the census of 2000, there were 5,113 people, 1,889 households, and 1,377 families residing in the town. The population density was 115.3 inhabitants per square mile (44.5/km^{2}). There were 1,988 housing units at an average density of 44.8 per square mile (17.3/km^{2}). The racial makeup of the town was 97.63% White, 0.51% Black or African American, 0.10% Native American, 0.33% Asian, 0.29% from other races, and 1.13% from two or more races. Of the population, 0.80% were Hispanic or Latino of any race.

There were 1,889 households, out of which 36.5% had children under the age of 18 living with them, 58.9% were married couples living together, 9.8% had a female householder with no husband present, and 27.1% were non-families. Of all households, 22.8% were made up of individuals, and 10.3% had someone living alone who was 65 years of age or older. The average household size was 2.69 and the average family size was 3.17.

In the town, the population was spread out, with 28.4% under the age of 18, 5.7% from 18 to 24, 31.0% from 25 to 44, 22.3% from 45 to 64, and 12.7% who were 65 years of age or older. The median age was 37 years. For every 100 females, there were 96.1 males. For every 100 females age 18 and over, there were 95.7 males.

The median income for a household in the town was $50,553, and the median income for a family was $56,069. Males had a median income of $40,284 versus $29,250 for females. The per capita income for the town was $20,476. 3.4% of the population and 1.2% of families were below the poverty line. Out of the total population, 1.5% of those under the age of 18 and 2.6% of those 65 and older were living below the poverty line.

== Education ==
Barre is part of the Quabbin Regional School District along with, Hardwick, Hubbardston, New Braintree, and Oakham. Elementary School Students attend Ruggles Lane Elementary School, from grades K–5, middle school students attend Quabbin Regional Middle School from grades 6–8, and high school students attend Quabbin Regional High School from grades 9–12. It is also home to the administrative offices (including the office of the superintendent) of the Quabbin Regional School District.

From 1840 into the twentieth century, it was home to the Elm Hill Private School and Home for the Education of Feeble-Minded Youth.

Barre is home to Stetson School.

== Government ==
State government
| State Representative(s): | Donald R. Berthiaume, Jr. (R-5th Worcester) |
| State Senator(s): | Peter J. Durant (R-Worcester and Hampshire) |
| Governor's Councilor(s): | Paul M. DePalo (D) |
Federal government
| U.S. Representative(s): | James P. McGovern (D-2nd District) |
| U.S. Senators: | Elizabeth Warren (D), Ed Markey (D) |

== Sites of interest ==
- Barre Historical Society & Museum
- Barre Players Theater
- Insight Meditation Society – Buddhist organization in Barre, Massachusetts
- Barre Center for Buddhist Studies – Center for Buddhist studies in Massachusetts, USA
- Russell's Fossil Museum
- Barre Falls Dam – Dam in Massachusetts, United States
- The Cross, a geoglyph and park

== Notable people ==
- David Oliver Allen, missionary and author
- Quock Walker, an American slave who won his freedom from Massachusetts Supreme Court in 1781; his case helped to abolish slavery in Massachusetts
- Stephen Brewer, state senator
- Ebenezer Childs, pioneer and legislator
- Timothy Jenkins, congressman
- Walker Lewis, black abolitionist, Masonic Grand Master of African Grand Lodge #1, and Mormon Elder
- John Murray, Representative to the Great and General Court of the Province of Massachusetts Bay for Rutland's Northwest District
- Joseph B. Plummer, general
- Jacob Riis, journalist, author of How the Other Half Lives
- Daniel Ruggles, Confederate general
- Abigail Willis Tenney Smith (1809–1885), missionary to the Sandwich Islands; teacher
