= Prostration (Buddhism) =

Practice in Buddhism

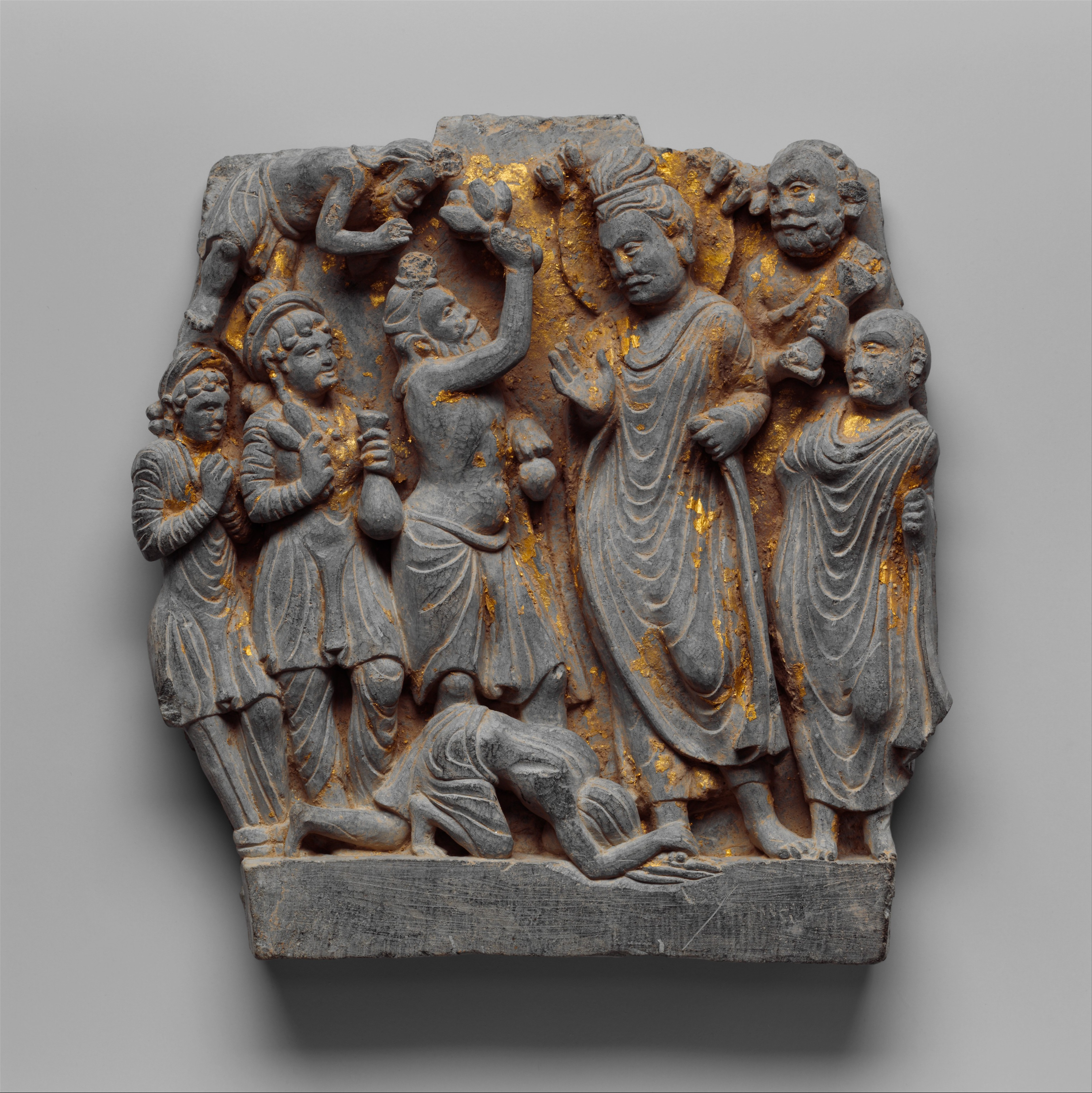
Gandharan relief depicting the ascetic Megha (Shakyamuni in a past life) prostrating before the past Buddha Dīpaṅkara and vowing to become a Buddha, c. 2nd century CE (Gandhara, Swat Valley)

A prostration (Pali: panipāta, Sanskrit: namas-kara, Chinese: 禮拜, lǐbài, Japanese: raihai) is a gesture used in Buddhist practice to show reverence to the Triple Gem (comprising the Buddha, his teachings, and the spiritual community) and other objects of veneration.

Among Buddhists prostration is believed to be beneficial for practitioners for several reasons, including:

- an experience of giving or veneration
- an act to purify defilements, especially conceit
- a preparatory act for meditation
- an act that accumulates merit (see karma)

In contemporary Western Buddhism, some teachers use prostrations as a practice unto itself, while other teachers relegate prostrations to customary liturgical ritual, ancillary to meditation.

== Theravada Buddhism ==
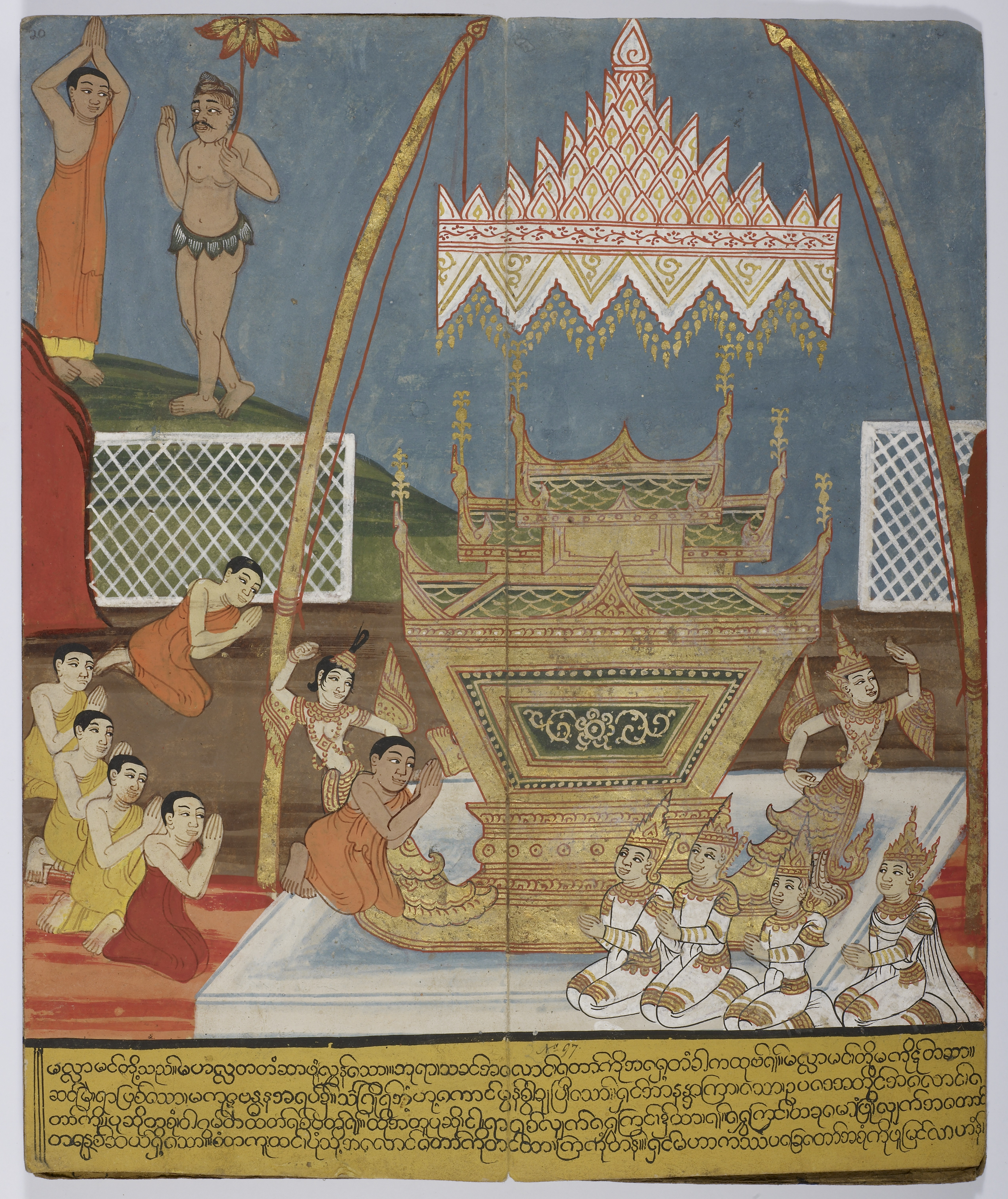
Burma, mid 19th century. Mahākassapa meeting the ājīvika ascetic (above) and paying homage to the Buddha's feet before the funeral pyre is lit (below).

In the Pali canon, laypersons prostrating before the then-living Buddha is mentioned in several suttas. In Theravada Buddhism, as part of daily practice, one typically prostrates before and after chanting and meditation. On these occasions, one typically prostrates three times: once to the Buddha, once to the Dhamma, and once to the Sangha. More generally, one can also prostrate before "any sacred object of veneration."

Theravada Buddhists execute a type of prostration that is known as "five-point veneration" (Pali: patitthitapanca) or the "five-limbed prostration" (Pali: pañc'anga-vandana) where the two palms and elbows, two sets of toes and knees, and the forehead are placed on the floor. More specifically:

... In the kneeling position, one's hand in añjali [palms together, fingers flat out and pointed upward] are raised to the forehead and then lowered to the floor so that the whole forearm to the elbow is on the ground, the elbow touching the knee. The hands, palm down, are four to six inches apart with just enough room for the forehead to be brought to the ground between them. Feet are still as for the kneeling position and the knees are about a foot apart....

In Myanmar (Burma), prostrations are accompanied by the common Buddhist prayer, known as okāsa.

In Thailand, traditionally, each of the three aforementioned prostrations are accompanied by the following Pali verses:

First Prostration	Araham samma-sambuddho bhagava Buddham bhagavantam abhivademi.	The Noble One, the fully Enlightened One, the Exalted One, I bow low before the Exalted Buddha.
Second Prostration	Svakkhato bhagavata dhammo Dhammam namassami.	The Exalted One's well-expounded Dhamma; I bow low before the Dhamma.
Third Prostration	Supatipanno bhagavato savakasangho sangham namami.	The Exalted One's Sangha of well-practiced disciples I bow low before the Sangha.

In Theravadin countries such as Sri Lanka, when one goes before one's teacher, in order to "open one's mind up to receive instructions," one bows and recites the phrase, "Okāsa ahaṃ bhante vandāmi" ("I pay homage to you venerable sir").

== Mahayana Buddhism ==
An American in Dokusan

Zen master Phillip Kapleau recounts his first stay in "a real Zen monastery":

How well, too, I remember the first time I came before my teacher in dokusan. As you know, it is customary to prostrate oneself before the roshi as a sign of respect and humility. But how that went against my grain, and how I resisted it! "... [W]hat does all this have to do with Zen?" My teacher, well aware of these thoughts within me, said nothing, viewing my frustrated maneuvers at each dokusan with an amused smile. Then one day, when I was having a more awkward time than usual trying to prostrate, he suddenly shot at me, "Kapleau-san, when you make prostrations in dokusan you are not bowing down before me but before your own Buddha-nature."

In Zen Buddhism, both half- and full-prostrations are used. Zen master Robert Aitken writes:

The Zen student is taught that in raihai [prostration] one throws everything away. Pivoting the forearms on the elbows and raising the hands [palms up] while prostrated is the act of raising the Buddha's feet above one's head.

Roshi Philip Kapleau writes:

The act of unself-conscious prostration before a Buddha is ... possible under the impetus of reverence and gratitude. Such "horizontalizings of the mast of ego" cleanse the heart-mind, rendering it flexible and expansive, and open the way to an understanding and appreciation of the exalted mind and manifold virtues of the Buddha and patriarchs. So there arises within us a desire to express our gratitude and show our respect before their personalized forms through appropriate rituals.

Zen master Huang Po, of the 9th century, is said to have done prostrations so intensely that he wore a permanent red mark on his forehead.

== Vajrayana Buddhism ==
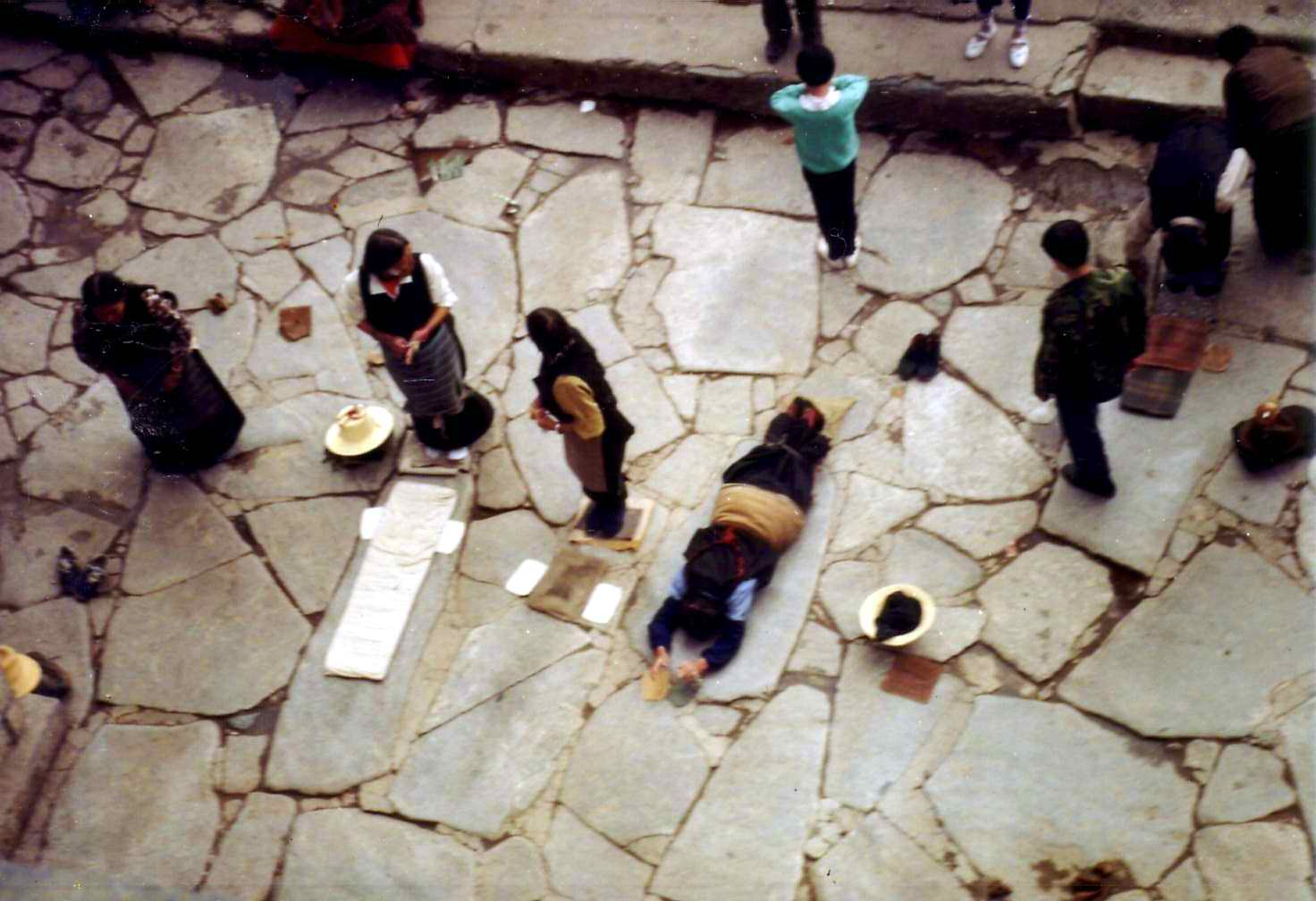
Pilgrims prostrating at the Jokhang, Lhasa

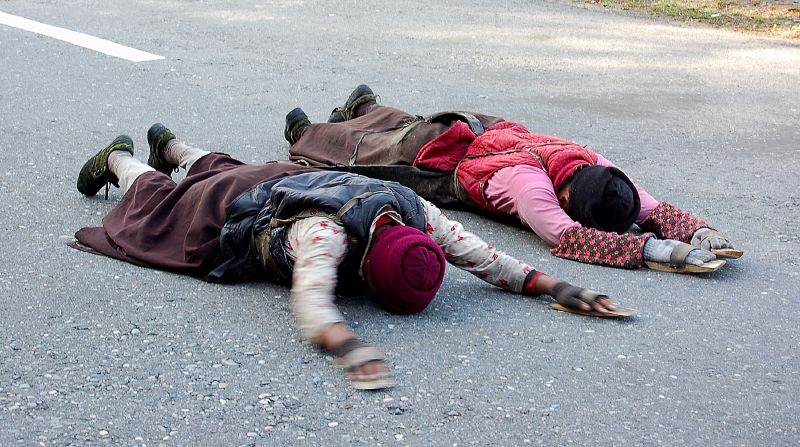
Tibetans on a pilgrimage to Lhasa, doing full-body prostrations

In Vajrayana Buddhism, prostrations are often performed before meditation or teachings, but can form a separate practice by itself. Prostrations are seen as a means of purifying one's body, speech and mind of karmic defilements, especially pride. Prostrations are used in tandem with visualization and can be used to express reverence to Guru Rinpoche and others.

For example, in the context of offering homage to Guru Rinpoche, prostrations are to be performed as follows:

...Bring your hands together in the 'lotus bud' mudra (the base of the palm and the fingertips together, and thumbs slightly tucked in) and place them on the crown of the head, then to the throat and heart. As you place your hands on your crown, you offer homage to Guru Rinpoche's enlightened body, purify defilements and obscurations incurred through the avenue of your body, and establish the potential to realize nirmanakaya. At your throat, you offer homage to his enlightened speech, and establish the potential to realized sambhogakaya. Bringing your hands to your heart, you offer homage to his enlightened mind, purify your mind's obscurations, and establish the potential to realize dharmakaya. The actual prostration is performed by dropping the body forward and stretching it full length on the floor, the arms outstretched in front.... Again, with hands in the lotus bud mudra, bend your arms back and touch your hands to the top of your head, a gesture that acknowledges the blessing flowing from Guru Rinpoche. Then stretch your arms out once more and push yourself up.... Bring your hands into the lotus bud mudra for the third time and touch your heart in a gesture of reverence. Then, with a smooth motion, bring your hands to your crown and perform the next prostration....

This type of prostration is often done 3, 7, 21, or 108 times. A prostration mala can be used to facilitate counting.

This form of prostration is used with enlightened beings other than Guru Rinpoche as well.

Prostrations done in large numbers (like 100,000) can be part of the preliminary practices to the practice of tantra. Other practices like this can be reciting the Refuge prayer, mandala offerings, Vajrasattva mantras and other practices called ngöndro.

== See also ==
- Three Refuges
- Five Precepts
- Eight Precepts
- Uposatha
- Puja (Buddhism)
- Okāsa
- Gadaw, a Burmese form of paying obeisance
- Householder (Buddhism)
- Dhammika Sutta (Sn 2.14)
- Dighajanu Sutta (AN 8.54)
- Sigalovada Sutta (DN 31)

== Bibliography ==
- Aitken, Robert (1982). Taking the Path of Zen. NY:North Point Press. ISBN 0-86547-080-4.
- Aitken, Robert (2002). "Formal Practice: Buddhist or Christian" in Buddhist-Christian Studies (2002), Vol. 22, pp. 63–76. Available on-line at: http://www.thezensite.com/ZenEssays/Miscellaneous/FormalPractice.htm
- Indaratana Maha Thera, Elgiriye (2002). Vandana: The Album of Pali Devotional Chanting and Hymns. Penang, Malaysia:Mahindarama Dhamma Publication. Available on-line at: http://www.buddhanet.net/pdf_file/vandana02.pdf.
- Kapleau, Phillip (1989a). The Three Pillars of Zen: Teaching, Practice and Enlightenment. NY: Anchor Books. ISBN 0-385-26093-8.
- Kapleau, Philip (1989b). Zen: Merging of East and West. NY:Anchor Book. ISBN 0-385-26104-7.
- Khantipalo, Bhikkhu (1982). Lay Buddhist Practice: The Shrine Room, Uposatha Day, Rains Residence (The Wheel No. 206/207). Kandy, Sri Lanka:Buddhist Publication Society. Also transcribed (1995) and available on-line at: http://www.accesstoinsight.org/lib/authors/khantipalo/wheel206.html.
- Tromge, Jane (1995). Ngondro Commentary: Instructions for the Concise Preliminary Practices of the New Treasure of Dudjom / compiled from the teachings of His Eminence Chagdud Tulku. Junction City, CA:Padma Publishing. ISBN 1-881847-06-3.
