= Kalyāṇa-mittatā =

Buddhist spiritual friendship or fellowship

Kalyāṇa-mittatā (Pali; Skt.: -mitratā; CHN: 善知識) is a Buddhist concept of "admirable friendship" within Buddhist community life, applicable to both monastic and householder relationships. One involved in such a relationship is known as a "good friend", "virtuous friend", "noble friend" or "admirable friend" (kalyāṇa-mitta, -mitra).

== Canonical sources ==
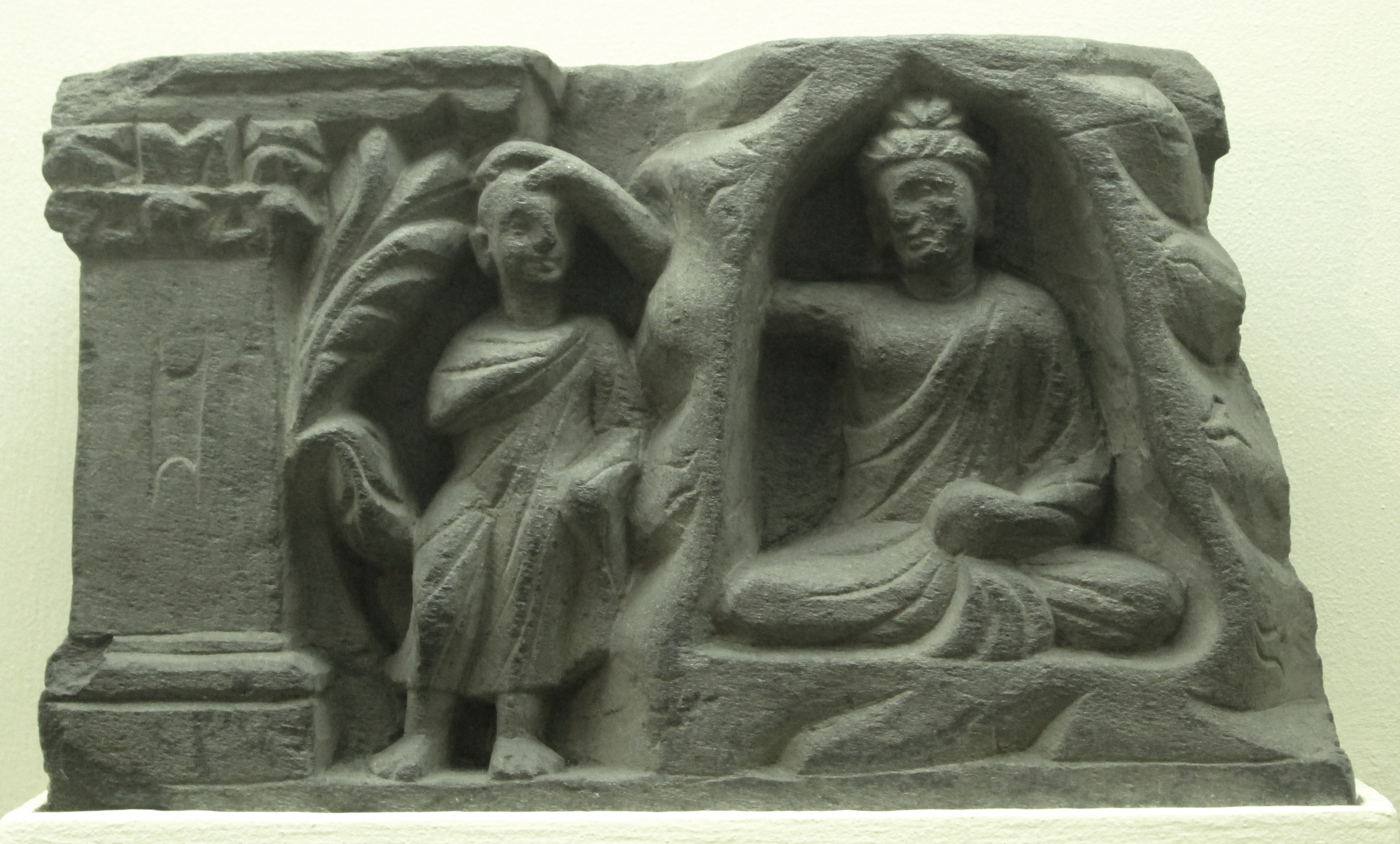
Sculpture at Vulture Peak, Rajgir, India, depicting the Buddha consoling Ānanda

In the Pali Canon's Upaddha Sutta (SN 45.2), there is a conversation between Lord Buddha and his disciple Ananda in which Ananda enthusiastically declares, 'This is half of the holy life, lord: admirable friendship, admirable companionship, admirable camaraderie.' The Buddha replies:

'Don't say that, Ananda. Don't say that. Admirable friendship, admirable companionship, admirable camaraderie is actually the whole of the holy life. When a monk has admirable people as friends, companions, & comrades, he can be expected to develop & pursue the Noble Eightfold Path.'

The Buddha elaborates that, through such friendships, one develops each of the path factors through seclusion, dispassion and cessation. Further, the Buddha states that through spiritual friendship with the Buddha himself followers have gained release from suffering.

According to Dr. R.L. Soni, canonical discourses state that "companionship with the wise" leads to the following developmental progression: "listening to good advice, rational faith, noble thoughts, clear thinking, self-control, good conduct, conquest of the hindrances, gaining of wisdom and the consequent liberation."

More broadly, in Itivuttaka 1.17, the Buddha declares:

'With regard to external factors, I don't envision any other single factor like admirable friendship as doing so much for a monk in training, who has not attained the heart's goal but remains intent on the unsurpassed safety from bondage. A monk who is a friend with admirable people abandons what is unskillful and develops what is skillful.'

The following sutta also refers to spiritual friendship .

(AN 4:94; II 93–95)

Four Kinds of Persons “These four kinds of persons, O monks, are found existing in the world. What four? “Here, monks, a certain person gains internal serenity of mind but does not gain the higher wisdom of insight into phenomena.12 Another person gains the higher wisdom of insight into phenomena but does not gain internal serenity of mind. Another person gains neither internal serenity of mind nor the higher wisdom of insight into phenomena. And another person gains both internal serenity of mind and the higher wisdom of insight into phenomena. “Therein, monks, the person who gains internal serenity of mind but not the higher wisdom of insight into phenomena should approach one who gains the higher wisdom and inquire of him: ‘How, friend, should formations be seen? How should formations be explored? How should formations be discerned with insight?’13 The other then answers him as he has seen and understood the matter thus: ‘Formations should be seen in such a way; they should be explored in such a way; they should be discerned with insight in such a way.’ At a later time this one gains both internal serenity of mind and the higher wisdom of insight into phenomena. “Therein, monks, the person who gains the higher wisdom of insight into phenomena but not internal serenity of mind should approach one who gains internal serenity and inquire of him: ‘How, friend, should the mind be steadied? How should the mind be composed? How should the mind be unified? How should the mind be concentrated? ’ The other then answers him as he has seen and understood the matter thus: ‘The mind should be steadied in such a way, composed in such a way, unified in such a way, concentrated in such a way.’ At a later time this one gains both internal serenity of mind and the higher wisdom of insight into phenomena. “Therein, monks, the person who gains neither internal serenity of mind nor the higher wisdom of insight into phenomena should approach one who gains both and inquire of him: ‘How, friend, should the mind be steadied?… How, friend, should formations be seen?…’ The other then answers him as he has seen and understood the matter thus: ‘The mind should be steadied in such a way…. Formations should be seen in such a way.…’ At a later time this one gains both internal serenity of mind and the higher wisdom of insight into phenomena. “Therein, monks, the person who gains both internal serenity of mind and the higher wisdom of insight into phenomena should establish himself in just these wholesome states and make a further effort for the destruction of the taints.”

In terms of householders, the Buddha provides the following elaboration in the Dighajanu Sutta (AN 8.54):

'And what is meant by admirable friendship? There is the case where a lay person, in whatever town or village he may dwell, spends time with householders or householders' sons, young or old, who are advanced in virtue. He talks with them, engages them in discussions. He emulates consummate conviction in those who are consummate in conviction, consummate virtue in those who are consummate in virtue, consummate generosity in those who are consummate in generosity, and consummate discernment in those who are consummate in discernment. This is called admirable friendship.'

== Post-canonical Pali texts ==
In the first-century CE exegetic Vimuttimagga, Arahant Upatissa identifies the need to find a "good friend" or "pre-eminent friend" in order to develop "excellent concentration." The good friend should understand the Tipiṭaka, kamma, "beneficent worldly knowledge" and the Four Noble Truths. Citing Anguttara Nikaya 7.36, Upatissa says that a bhikkhūmitto ("monk friend") should have the following seven qualities:

Lovableness, esteemableness, venerableness, the ability to counsel well, patience (in listening), the ability to deliver deep discourses and the not applying oneself to useless ends."

In the fifth-century CE Visuddhimagga ("Path of Purification"), Buddhaghosa also mentions the need to find a "good friend" in the context of finding one who will be your "giver of a meditation subject." As did Upatissa, Buddhaghosa refers to the seven qualities of AN 7.36 and adds that only the Buddha has all these qualities. If the Buddha is not available to be the good friend, then one of the eighty great śrāvakas is recommended; if one of them is not available, then one should find for a good friend who has destroyed all fetters through the attainment of all jhānas and the development of vipassanā. Otherwise, in descending order, one may choose: an anāgāmi or sakadagami or sotāpanna or non-arahat who has attained a jhānic state, or one who knows the Tipiṭaka or two piṭakas or one piṭaka, or one who knows a nikāya and its commentaries and who is conscientious.

== Teacher-student relationship ==
In traditional schools of Buddhist thought, a spiritual friendship is a friendship not between one's peers, but a friendship between a student and their spiritual teacher. From the aforementioned suttas, we can see that the Buddha believed it vital for spiritual growth to have a spiritual friend. This friendship is built on a deep respect for the teacher's knowledge and the student's potential, and, through this respect and friendship, the two individuals learn constructive behaviour. Constructive behaviour in Buddhism is to think, speak, and behave in a constructive way towards life, leading to personal happiness, and, then, to enlightenment.

Within the Vajrayana tradition, the teacher-student relationship, akin to its parallel Hindu concept, is considered of extreme importance to guide the student on the proper tantric path and to avoid the harmful consequences of misunderstanding and incorrect practice.

== Peer relationships ==
Spiritual friendships are important to building a bond between peers within the Buddhist community.

Sangharakshita, the founder of the Triratna Buddhist Community, emphasises Spiritual friendship—that by having a group of peers as spiritual friends, we learn more about being good people than we would in isolation:

[Sangharakshita] stresses the value of friendships with peers, in particular having at least one Platonic friend with whom we can be intimate and completely frank. Through friendship we have the opportunity to develop the virtues of generosity, compassion, patience and forgiveness.

== See also ==
- Dīghajāṇu Sutta - contextualizes kalyāṇa-mittatā among other householder duties.
- Sigālovāda Sutta - elaborated on the importance of having and being a true friend who is also a kalyāṇa-mittatā
- Dhammika Sutta
