= Householder (Buddhism) =

Buddhist laity

Translations of householder
- Sanskrit: gṛhin, gṛhastha, gṛhapati
- Pali: gihin, gahattha, gahapati
- Chinese: 居士
- Indonesian: perumah tangga
- Japanese: 居士
- Khmer: គ្រហស្ថ (Kror Hors)
- Mon: ဂရှ် ([həròh])
- Sinhala: ගිහි
- Tagalog: maybahay
- Tamil: இல்லறம்
- Tibetan: khyim-pa
- Thai: คฤหัสถ์ (RTGS: kha rue hat)
- Vietnamese: Cư sĩ

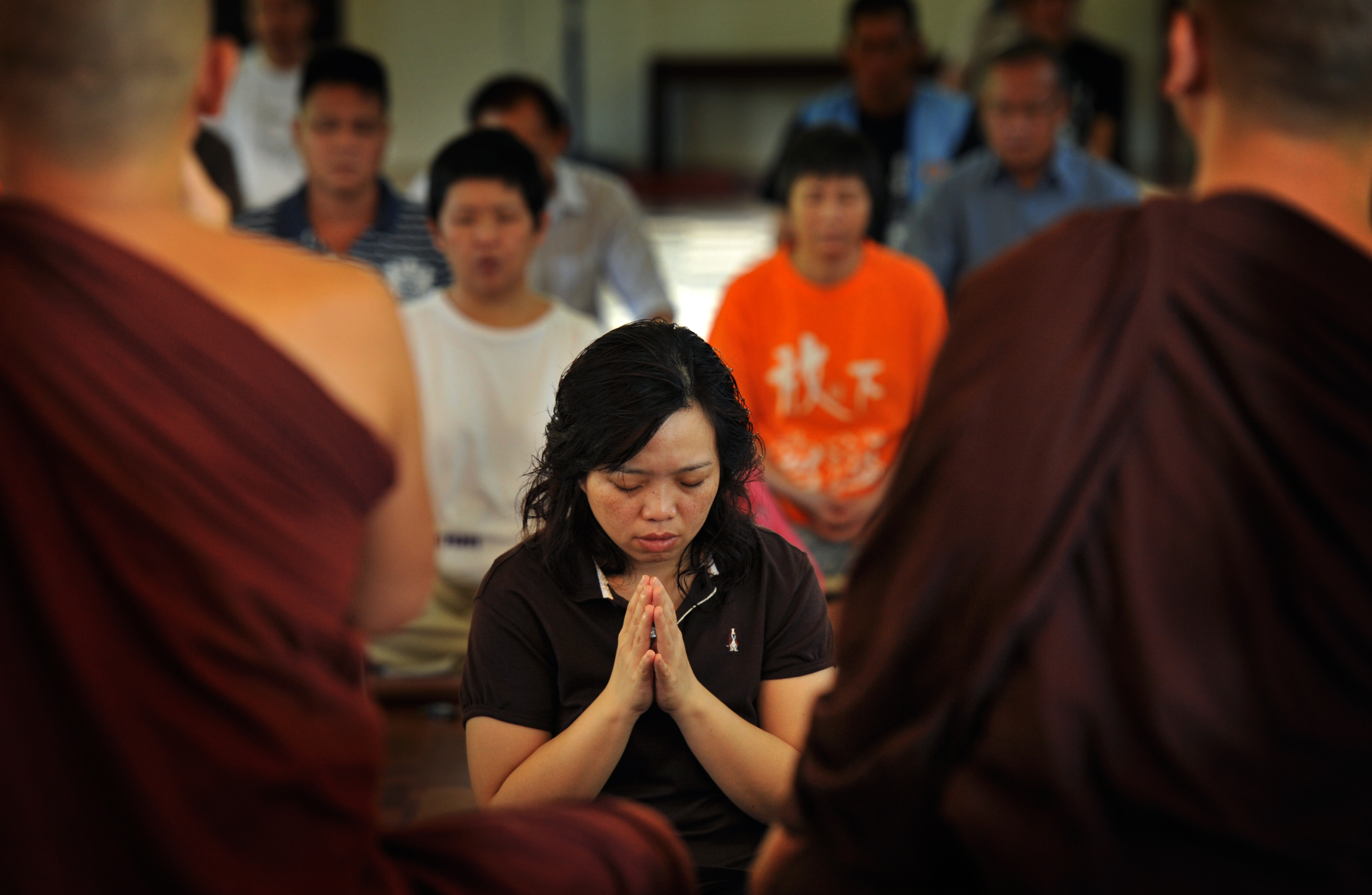
Buddhist monks giving a teaching or blessing to lay people in Myanmar

In English translations of Buddhist texts, householder denotes a variety of terms. Most broadly, it refers to any layperson, and most narrowly, to a wealthy and prestigious familial patriarch. In contemporary Buddhist communities, householder is often used synonymously with laity, or non-monastics.

The Buddhist notion of householder is often contrasted with that of wandering ascetics (Pali: Pāḷi: samaṇa; Sanskrit: śramaṇa) and monastics (bhikkhu and bhikkhuni), who would not live (for extended periods) in a normal house and who would pursue freedom from attachments to houses and families.

Upāsakas and upāsikās, also called śrāvakas and śrāvikās - are householders and other laypersons who take refuge in the Three Jewels (the Buddha, the teachings and the community) and practice the Five Precepts. In southeast Asian communities, lay disciples also give alms to monks on their daily rounds and observe weekly uposatha days. In Buddhist thought, the cultivation of ethical conduct and dāna or "almsgiving" will themselves refine consciousness to such a level that rebirth in one of the lower heavens is likely even if there is no further "Noble" Buddhist practice (connected with the Supramundane goal of Nibbana, "Unbinding"). This level of attainment is viewed as a proper aim for laypersons.

In some traditional Buddhist societies, such as in Myanmar and Thailand, people transition between householder and monk and back to householder with regularity and celebration as in the practice of shinbyu among the Bamar people. One of the evolving features of Buddhism in the West is the increasing dissolution of the traditional distinction between monastics and laity.

For all the diversity of Buddhist practices in the West, general trends in the recent transformations of Buddhist practice ... can be identified. These include an erosion of the distinction between professional and lay Buddhists; a decentralization of doctrinal authority; a diminished role for Buddhist monastics; an increasing spirit of egalitarianism; greater leadership roles for women; greater social activism; and, in many cases, an increasing emphasis on the psychological, as opposed to the purely religious, nature of practice.

== Theravāda perspectives ==
In the Pāli Canon, householders received diverse advice and instructions from the Buddha and his noble disciples.

Core householder practices include undertaking the Five Precepts and taking refuge in the Triple Gem, leading an ethical livelihood and practicing generosity. In addition, the canon nurtures the essential spiritual bond between householders and monastics still apparent today in Southeast Asian communities.

=== Who is a householder? ===
In traditional Indian society, a householder (Sanskrit gṛhastin) is typically a settled adult male with a family. In the Pali canon, various Pali words have been translated into the English word "householder", including agārika, gahapati, gahattha and gihin. Vocations most often associated with householders in the Pali canon are those of guild foreman, banker and merchant (Pali, seṭṭhi) but other vocations are mentioned such as farmer and carpenter. Gombrich (2002, pp. 56–7) states:

Who were these people in terms of class or profession? In the Canon, most of them evidently own land, but they usually have labourers to do the physical work. Sometimes they are also in business. In fact, they illustrate how it is in the first instance wealth derived from agriculture which provides business capital. The average gahapati who gave material support to the Buddha and his Sangha thus seems to have been something like a gentleman farmer, perhaps with a town house. On the other hand, inscriptions in the western Deccan, where Buddhism flourished in the early centuries CE, use the term gahapati to refer to urban merchants. We must distinguish between reference and meaning: the meaning of gahapati is simple and unvarying, but the reference shifts with the social context.

Other people in the canon who are sometimes identified as "householders" in contemporary translations are simply those individuals who dwelt in a home or who had not renounced "home life" (Pali, agārasmā) for "homelessness" (Pali, anagāriya).

=== Householder ethics ===
While there is no formal "householder discipline" in the vinaya or "code of ethics", the Sigalovāda Sutta (DN 31) has been referred to as "the Vinaya of the householder" (gihi-vinaya). This sutta includes:

- an enumeration of the Five Precepts
- an analysis of good-hearted (Pali: su-hada) friends
- a description of respectful actions for one's parents, teachers, spouse, friends, workers and religious guides.

Similarly, in the "Dhammika Sutta" (Sn 2.14), the Buddha articulates the "layman's rule of conduct" (Pali, gahatthavatta), as follows:

- the Five Precepts
- the Five Precepts for Uposatha days
- support of one's parents
- engaging in fair business.

The Mahānāma sūtra has been called the "locus classicus on the definition of upāsaka." This sutra is preserved in five versions (two in Pali, three in Chinese) representing two different recensions, one in the Samyuktāgama/Samyuttanikāya, the other in the Anguttaranikāya and in the Samyuktāgama and further developed in the Abhidharmaskandha, one of the canonical books of the Sarvastivadin Abhidharma. In this sutra the Buddha defines an upāsaka in terms of faith (śraddhā), morality (śīla), liberality (tyāga), and wisdom (prajñā), as follows:

- "One produces a deep thought of faith toward the Tathagata and is established in faith. He never lacks faith or is evil towards śramaṇas, brāhmaṇas, or deva, or māra, or brahmā. This is called the faith of an upāsaka."
- "Not to kill, not to steal, not to seduce, not to lie, and not to drink liquor, etc. This is called the morality of an upāsaka".
- "It is a rule (dharma) for an upāsaka that he should abandon stinginess. As for all living beings, without exception, stinginess, and envy are destroyed by him. Therefore, his mind should be devoid of stinginess and envy, and he should produce thoughts of liberality and personally donate, tirelessly. This is called 'possessed of liberality.'"
- "An upāsaka knows suffering according to reality, knows the collection of suffering according to reality, knows the extinction of suffering according to reality, and knows the path to the extinction of suffering according to reality. He understands with certainty. This is called 'possessed of wisdom.'"

Some early schools, particularly the Sautrāntika, allowed for aparipūrṇa-upāsaka (partial lay vow holders), who took anywhere from one to four of the śīla observances.

Other suttas in the canon likewise underline keeping the precepts, maintaining virtuous friends, homage to one's benefactors and earning one's wealth honestly.

Elsewhere in the Sutta Pitaka the Buddha provides moral instruction to householders and their family members on how to be good parents, spouses and children.

Buddha's advice to Buddhist laywomen is contained mostly in the Anguttara Nikaya 8:49; IV 269-71. His advice was as follows:

- Be capable at one's work
- Work with diligence and skill
- Manage domestic help skillfully (if relevant) and treat them fairly
- Perform household duties efficiently
- Be hospitable to one's husband's parents and friends
- Be faithful to one's husband; protect and invest family earnings
- Discharge responsibilities lovingly and conscientiously; accomplish faith (faith in the possibility of enlightenment, and of the enlightenment of the Buddha.)
- Accomplish moral discipline (observe/practise the five precepts.)
- Practise generosity (cultivate a mind free from stinginess or avarice; delight in charity, giving and sharing.)
- Cultivate wisdom (Perceive the impermanence of all things.).

The Buddha also gave advice on householders' financial matters. In the Anguttara Nikaya (4.61; II 65-68) it is said that the Buddha stated that there are four worthy ways in which to spend one's wealth:

- On the everyday maintenance of the happiness of oneself and one's family (as well as any employees, friends and co-workers);
- On providing insurance (against losses from fire, floods, unloved heirs and misfortune generally);
- By making offerings to relatives, guests, ancestors ( offerings to ancestors are traditionally made, in a respectful Halloween type ritual, throughout Buddhist countries on Ullambana, in the eighth lunar month – around October. Food offerings and good deeds are done in order to relieve the sufferings of hungry ghosts and to help rescue one's ancestors from the lower realms, to secure rebirth for them in higher realms. Many people visit cemeteries to make offerings to departed ancestors), the ruler and the devas (note that worshipping Devas will not bring you closer to enlightenment but it may give you some kind of material advantage);
- By providing alms to monks and nuns who are devoted to the attainment of nibbana. In the Digha Nikaya (III) the Buddha is said to have advised Sigala, a young man, that he should spend one fourth of his income on daily expenses, invest half in his business and put aside one fourth as insurance against an emergency.

=== Lay-monastic reciprocity ===
Some suttas suggest that Buddhist renunciates are best going it alone. Many others celebrate and provide instruction for a vital reciprocity between householders and monastics. For instance, in the Khuddaka Nikaya, the Buddha articulates that "brahmins and householders" (Pali, brāhmanagahapatikā) support monks by providing monks with robes, alms food, lodgings and medicine while monks teach brahmins and householders the Dhamma. In this sutta, the Buddha declares:

Householders & the homeless [monastics]
in mutual dependence
both reach the true Dhamma:
the unsurpassed safety from bondage.

=== Householders and future lives ===
In the Pali canon, the pursuit of Nibbana (Skt: Nirvana) within this lifetime usually starts with giving up the householder life. This is due to the householder life's intrinsic attachments to a home, a spouse, children and the associated wealth necessary for maintaining the household. Thus, instead of advising householders to relinquish these and all attachments as a prerequisite for the complete liberation from saṃsāra in this lifetime, the Buddha instructed householders on how to achieve "well-being and happiness" (hita-sukha) in this and future lives in a spiritually meaningful way.

In Buddhism, a householder's spiritual path is often conceived of in terms of making merit (Pali: puñña). The primary bases for meritorious action in Buddhism are generosity (dāna), ethical conduct (sīla) and mental development (bhāvanā). Practices associated with such behaviors are:

- Saddhā (faith)
  - Three jewels
- Dāna (giving)
  - Almsgiving
- Sīla (virtue)
  - Five precepts
  - Eight precepts
- Bhāvanā (mind)
  - Mettā
  - Vipassanā
- Paññā (wisdom)
  - Four Noble Truths
  - Three marks of existence

=== Householders and Nibbana ===
The Anguttara Nikāya (AN 6.119 and AN 6.120) identifies 19 householders (gahapati) who have "attained perfection" or, according to an alternate translation, "attained to certainty" (niṭṭhamgata) and "seen deathlessness, seen deathlessness with their own eyes" (amataddaso, amataṃ sacchikata). These householders are endowed (samannāgato) with six things (chahi dhammehi):

- unwavering faith (aveccappasādena) in the Buddha
- unwavering faith in the Dhamma
- unwavering faith in the Sangha
- noble moral discipline (ariyena sīlena)
- noble knowledge or wisdom (ariyena ñānena)
- noble release (ariyāya vimuttiyā)

While some interpret this passage to indicate that these householders have attained arahantship, others interpret it to mean they have attained at least "stream entry" (sotāpanna) but not final release. The para-canonical Milinda Pañha adds:

"...[F]or a householder who has attained arahantship: either, that very day, he goes forth into homelessness or he attains final Nibbāna. That day is not able to pass without one or other of these events taking place." (Miln. VII, 2)

In the Tevijjavacchagotta Sutta (MN 71 / M I.483) the Buddha is asked by the ascetic Vacchagotta "is there any householder who, without abandoning the fetter of householdship, on the dissolution of the body has made an end to suffering?" The Buddha replied "there is no householder who, without abandoning the fetter of householdship, on the dissolution of the body has made an end to suffering."

Attaining the state of anāgāmi or "non-returner" is portrayed in the early texts as the ideal goal for laity.

=== Prominent householders in the Pali canon ===
The following are examples of individuals who are explicitly identified as a "householder" in multiple suttas:

- Anathapindika, is referenced for instance in AN 1.14.249 as "the householder Sudatta, the foremost lay devotee."
- Citta, referenced for instance in AN 1.14.250 as "the [foremost] householder for explaining the Teaching." In SN 17.23, Citta is one of two male lay disciples identified for emulation by the Buddha.
- Hatthaka of Alavi, one of the foremost lay male disciples of the Buddha, he is one of two male lay disciples identified for emulation by the Buddha.
- Nakulapita and Nakulamata, referenced for instance in AN 1.14.257 and AN 1.14.266, respectively, as "the best confident" and the foremost "for undivided pleasantness."
- Visakha, very generous and wise female lay-disciple of the Buddha who, by listening frequently to Dhamma, and became a Stream-winner.
- Khujjuttarā a servant to a queen of Kosambi and a very learned laywoman who could recite the suttas and teach other ladies of the court.

Other individuals who are not explicitly identified in the suttas as "householder" but who, by the aforementioned broader criteria, might be considered a householder include:

- Ghatikara was a potter in the time of the Kassapa Buddha. He was an anāgāmi and his chief supporter. (MN 81).

== Mahāyāna perspectives ==
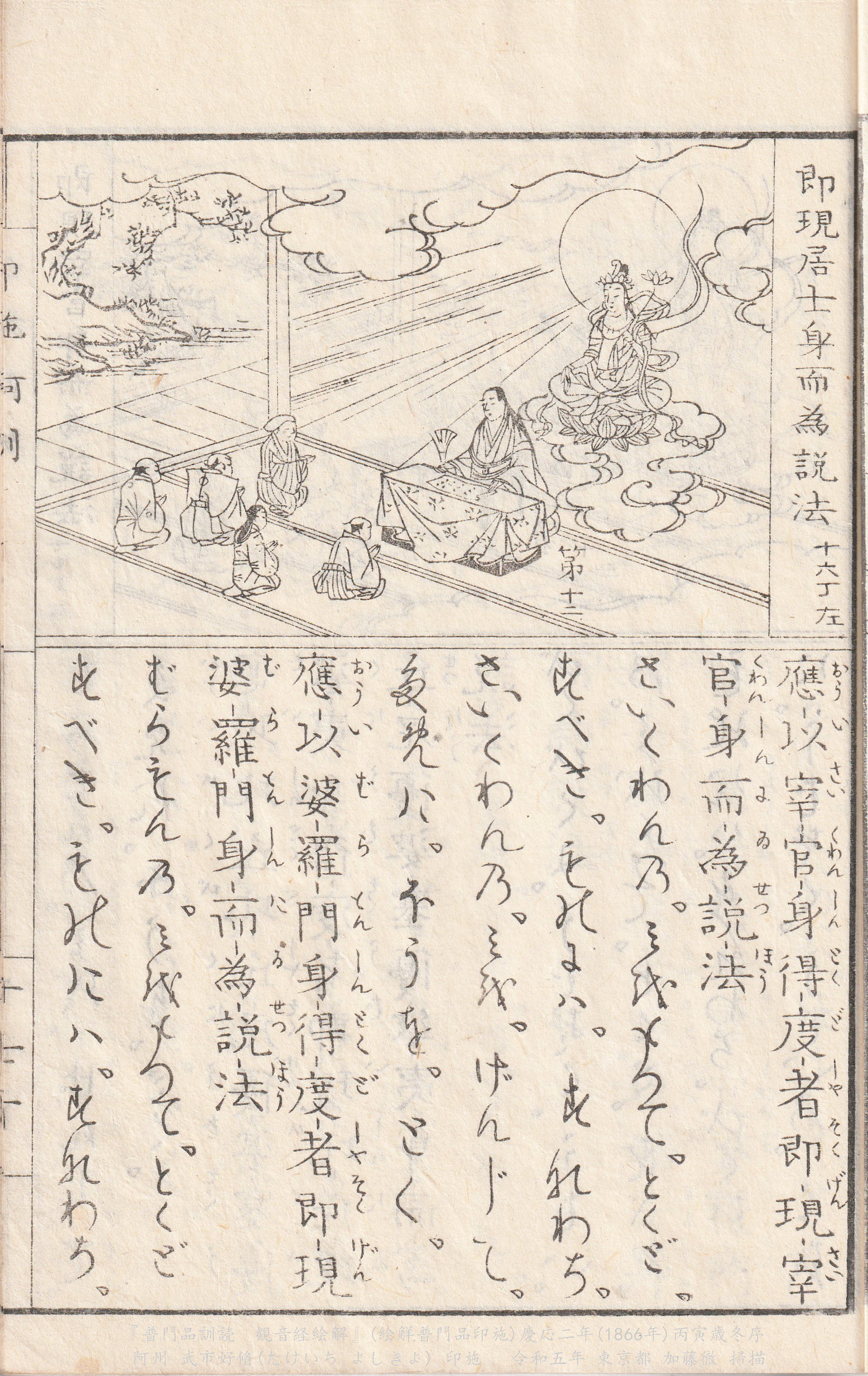
An illustration from an 1866 Japanese book. A long-haired householder, who is an incarnation of Bodhisattva Kannon, gives a sermon to folks.

The Sigalovāda Sutta has a parallel Chinese text. There are few differences between the Pali and Chinese versions. Further discussion of householder duties is found in the fourteenth chapter of the Sutra on Upasaka Precepts.

Dogen recommended that householders meditate at least five minutes each day.

In the Zen tradition, Vimalakīrti and Páng Yùn were prominent householders/laypersons who achieved enlightenment.

== Vajrayāna perspectives ==
The Vajrayana tradition has produced many prominent householders including Marpa Lotsawa, Dromtön, the heart son of Atiśa, and Padmasambhava.

The ngagpa (Wylie: sngags pa. feminine ngagma, Wylie: sngags ma) is an ordained Tantric practitioner, sometimes a householder with certain vows (dependent upon lama and lineage) that make them the householder equivalent of a monk or nun. The path of a ngakpa is a rigorous discipline whereby one "enjoys the sense-fields' as a part of one's practice. A practitioner utilizes the whole of the phenomenal world as one's path. Marrying, raising children, working jobs, leisure, art, play etc. are all means to realize the enlightened state or rigpa, non-dual awareness. As such, we can see the prominence of householders in the Vajrayana tradition. One can, however, be a householder without taking the vows of a ngagpa. Simply holding the five precepts, bodhisattva vows and the tantric vows while practising diligently can result in enlightenment.

== Contemporary Buddhist householder practices ==
Below common contemporary lay Buddhist practices are summarized. Some of these practices—such as taking Refuge and meditating—are common to all major schools. Other practices—such as taking the Eight Precepts or the Bodhisattva Vows—are not pan-Buddhist.

=== Theravāda practices ===
For Theravāda Buddhists, the following are practiced on a daily and weekly basis:

==== Daily practice ====
Paying Homage to the Triple Gem, taking Refuge in the Triple Gem, accepting the Five Precepts for Śīla (moral discipline) cultivation, reciting and contemplating on the Sutta for Bhāvanā (cultivation of the heart/mind), practice meditation to cultivate Sati (mindfulness), cultivating generosity by giving and sharing (Pali: dana).

==== Special day practices ====
(Uposatha, Vesakha Puja (Buddha Day), Asalha Puja (Dhamma Day) and Māgha Pūjā (Sangha Day)): accepting the Eight Precepts, listening to Buddhist sermons, studying and contemplating on the Pāli Canon, practice meditation, supporting and learning from the Sangha, visiting and supporting Buddhist monasteries.

==== Other practices ====
Undertaking a pilgrimage.

=== Mahāyāna practices ===
==== Daily practices ====
Prostrations to the Triple Gem, taking refuge in the Triple Gem, taking the Five Precepts, chanting sutras and the names of buddhas/bodhisattvas, meditating, cultivating compassion and bodhichitta, recitation of mantras.

==== Special day practices ====
Upholding the eight precepts, listening to teachings, supporting Sangha, repentance, performing offering ceremonies to sentient beings

==== Other practices ====
Bodhisattva vows, going on a retreat.

=== Vajrayāna practices ===
==== Daily practices ====
Prostrations, refuge, cultivating compassion and bodhicitta, bodhisattva vows, tantric vows (if applicable), meditation in the form of Tantric sādhanās (if applicable), purification techniques, recitation of mantras

==== Special day practices ====
Eight precepts, listening to teachings, offering ceremonies.

==== Other practices ====
Studying texts, receiving initiations and personal practice instructions from the teacher.

== See also ==
- Practices:
  - Three Refuges
  - Five Precepts
  - Eight Precepts
  - Dāna
  - Sīla
  - Bhāvanā
  - Samatha-vipassana
  - Training methods
  - Threefold training
  - Puja
  - Uposatha
  - Shinbyu
  - Awgatha
- Buddhist disciples:
  - Bhikkhu, Bhikkhuni (Buddhist monastic disciples)
  - Upasaka, Upasika (Buddhist lay disciples)
- Suttas (Pariyatti):
  - Dhammika Sutta (Sn 2.14)
  - Dighajanu Sutta (AN 8.54)
  - Sigalovada Sutta (DN 31)
- Buddhist ethics
- Buddhist economics
- Dharma centre
- Kalyāṇa-mittatā (Spiritual fellowship)

== Notes ==
Note 1: gahapati is given as "upper middle class", see The winds of change, Himanshu P. Ray, Delhi 1994, p. 20
