= Alms =

Money or goods given to poor people

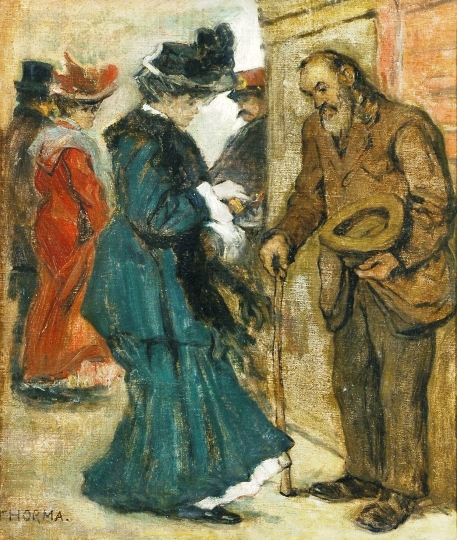
Woman giving alms by János Thorma

Alms (/ɑːmz/, /ɑːlmz/) are money, food, or other material goods donated to people living in poverty. Providing alms is often considered an act of charity. The act of providing alms is called almsgiving.

== Etymology ==
The word alms comes from the Old English ælmesse, ælmes, which comes from Late Latin eleemosyna, from Greek ἐλεημοσύνη eleēmosynē ("pity, alms"), from ἐλεήμων, eleēmōn ("merciful"), from ἔλεος, eleos, meaning "pity or mercy".

== Buddhism ==
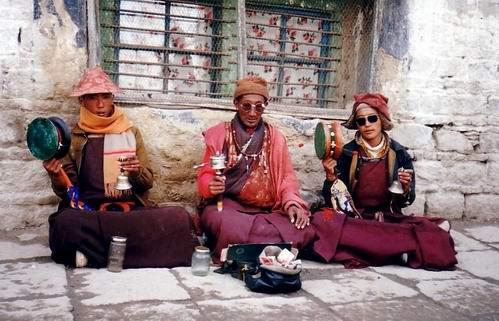
Three monks seeking alms in Lhasa, Tibet in 1993.

=== Dāna in Buddhism ===
In Buddhism, both "almsgiving" and "giving" are called "dāna" (Pāli). Such giving is one of the three elements of the path of practice as formulated by the Buddha for laypeople. This path of practice for laypeople is dāna, sīla, and bhāvanā.

Generosity towards other sentient beings is also emphasized in Mahayana as one of the perfections (paramita). As shown in Lama Tsong Khapa's 'The Abbreviated Points of the Graded Path' (Wylie: lam-rim bsdus-don):

Total willingness to give is the wish-granting gem for fulfilling the hopes of wandering beings.
It is the sharpest weapon to sever the knot of stinginess.
It leads to bodhisattva conduct that enhances self-confidence and courage,
And is the basis for universal proclamation of your fame and repute.
Realizing this, the wise rely, in a healthy manner, on the outstanding path
Of (being ever-willing) to offer completely their bodies, possessions, and positive potentials.
The ever-vigilant lama has practiced like that.
If you too would seek liberation,
Please cultivate yourself in the same way.

The giving of alms is the beginning of one's journey to Nirvana (Pali: nibbana). In practice, one can give anything with or without thought for Nibbana. This would lead to faith (Pali: saddha), one key power (Pali: bala) that one should generate within oneself for the Buddha, Dhamma, and Sangha.

According to the Pali canon:

Of all gifts [alms], the gift of Dhamma is the highest.

— Dhp. chapter 24, verse 354) (Note: In Pali, this line is: "Sabba danam, Dhamma danam jinati." This line can be found in the Dhammapada, Chapter 24, verse 354. Thanissaro (1997) translates this entire verse as: A gift of Dhamma conquers all gifts; the taste of Dhamma, all tastes; a delight in Dhamma, all delights; the ending of craving, all suffering & stress.)

=== Intentions for giving ===
The intentions behind giving play an important role in developing spiritual qualities. The suttas record various motives for exercising generosity. For example, the Anguttara Nikaya (A.iv, 236) enumerates the following eight motives:

1. One gives with annoyance, or as a way of offending the recipient, or with the idea of insulting him.
2. Fear also can motivate a person to make an offering.
3. One gives in return for a favor done to oneself in the past.
4. One also may give with the hope of getting a similar favor for oneself in the future.
5. One gives because giving is considered good.
6. "I cook, they do not cook. It is not proper for me who cooks not to give to those who do not cook." (i.e. Some give because they are able to do what others cannot.)
7. Some give alms to gain a good reputation.
8. Still others give alms to adorn and beautify the mind.
1. Asajja danam deti
2. Bhaya danam deti
3. Adasi me ti danam deti
4. Dassati me ti danam deti
5. Sadhu danan ti danam deti
6. Aham pacami, ime ne pacanti, na arahami pacanto apacantanam adatun ti danam deti
7. Imam me danam dadato kalyano kittisaddo abbhuggacchati ti danam deti
8. Cittalankara-cittaparikkarattham danam deti

=== In support of Buddhist monks ===
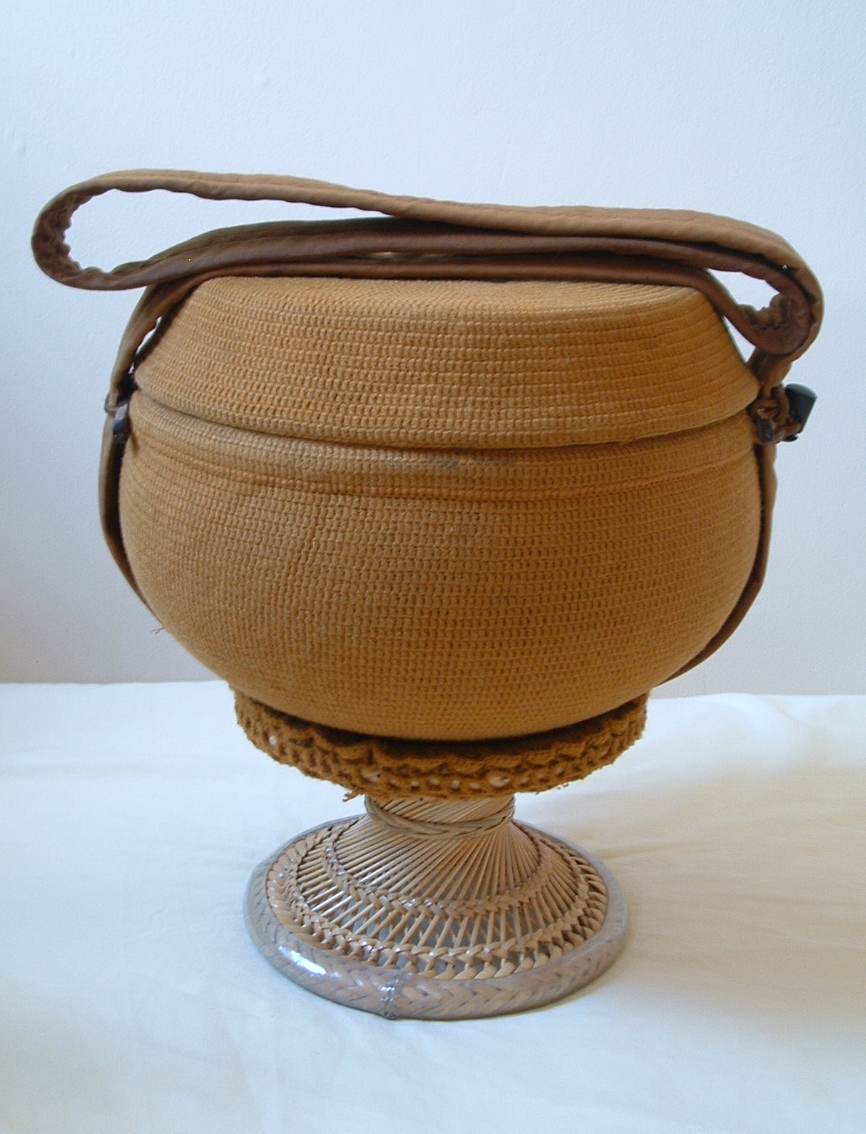
Alms bowl as used by bhikkhus for going on an alms round

In Buddhism, alms or almsgiving is the respect given by a lay Buddhist to a Buddhist monk, nun, spiritually-developed person or other sentient being. It is not charity as presumed by Western interpreters. It is closer to a symbolic connection to the spiritual realm and to show humbleness and respect in the presence of the secular society. (Note: Indicative of the mutual nature of the almsgiving exchange, in some Theravada countries, if a monk were to refuse alms from someone—a gesture known as "turning over the rice bowl"—this would be interpreted as an act of excommunication of the almsgiver by the monk. An example of such a refusal is the refusal of Buddhist monks to accept offerings by military personnel in military-occupied Myanmar (Mydans, 20 September 2007, NYT).) The act of almsgiving connects the human to the monk or nun and what he/she represents. As the Buddha has stated:

Householders & the homeless or charity [monastics]
in mutual dependence
both reach the true Dhamma....

— Itivuttaka 4.7 (Note: Almsgiving is also commended by the Buddha in a less prominent way in various other canonical texts such as the Dighajanu Sutta.)

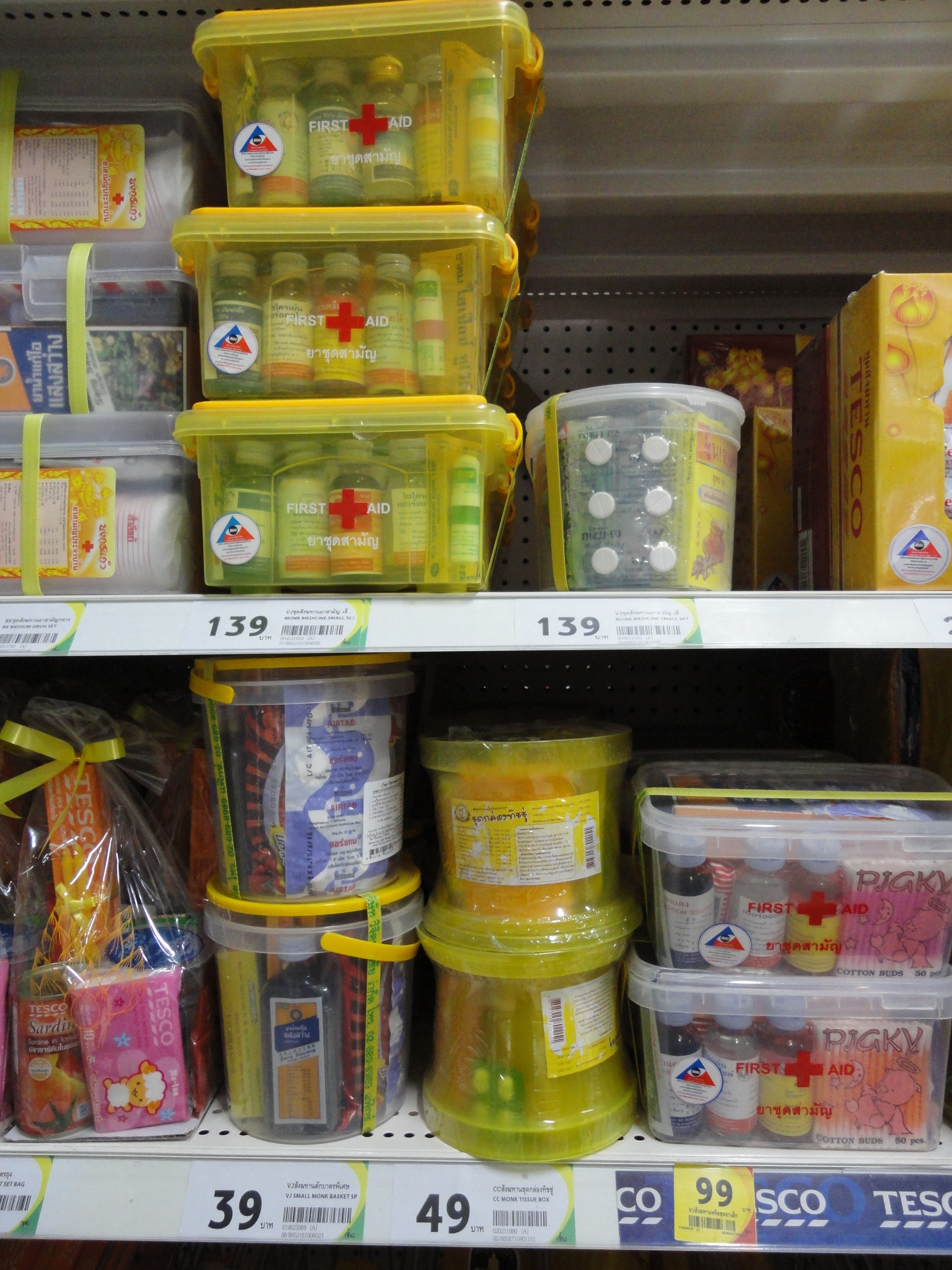
Pre-packaged alms kits can be bought to donate to monks

In Theravada Buddhism, nuns (Pāli: bhikkhunis) and monks (Pāli: bhikkhus) practice Takuhatsu (pindacara) where they collect food (piṇḍapāta). This is often perceived as allowing the laypeople to make merit (Pāli: puñña). Money cannot be accepted by a Theravadan Buddhist monk or nun in place of or in addition to food, as the Patimokkha training rules make it an offense worth forfeiture and confession.

In countries that follow Mahayana Buddhism, the practice of Takuhatsu has mostly died out. In China, Korea, and Japan, local cultures resisted the idea of giving food to 'begging' clerics, and there was no tradition of gaining 'merit' by donating to practitioners. After periods of persecution, monasteries were situated in remote mountain areas; the distance between the monastery and the nearest towns made this practice impossible. In Japan, the practice of a weekly or monthly Takuhatsu replaced the daily round. In the Himalayan countries, the large number of bhikkhus would have made an alms round a heavy burden on families. Competition with other religions for support also made daily practice difficult and even dangerous; the first Buddhist monks in the Silla dynasty of Korea were said to be beaten due to their minority at the time.

== Christianity ==
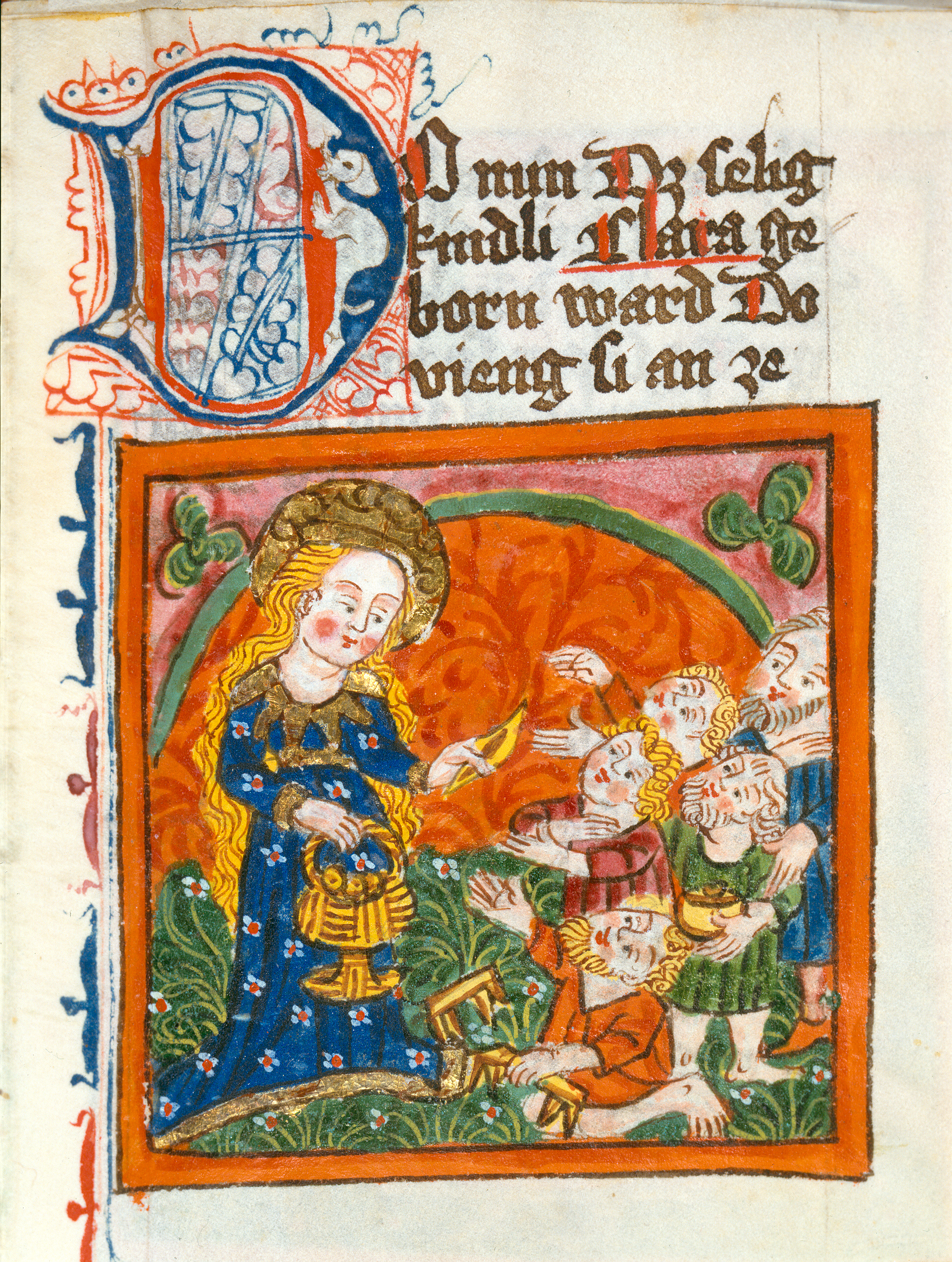
St. Clare distributes alms; Tennenbach Codex 4, illustrated before c. 1492

In Christianity, the giving of alms is viewed as an act of charity. In nearly all Christian denominations, money is donated to support the church's financial needs and its ministry to the less fortunate. In some churches, the alms are placed near to the altar to symbolize that the offering belongs to God and to represent the unity of the congregation. (Note: Compare with Matthew 5:23–24.)

In the New Testament, private acts of charity are a duty and considered virtuous only if not done for others to admire:

Be careful not to do your 'acts of righteousness' in front of others, to be seen by them. If you do, you will have no reward from your Father in heaven.

— Matthew 6:1

Jesus places the primary focus on the motives behind the outward and inward giving of alms, which should be love:

Rather, give as alms what is inside, and then everything will be clean for you!

— Luke 11:41

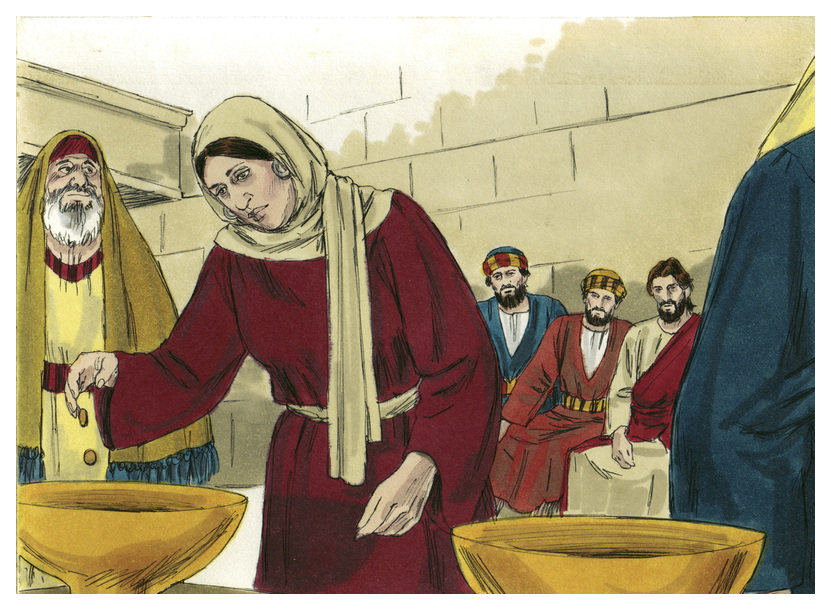
Jesus commends this poor but generous woman in Luke 21:1–4.

Jesus contrasts the giving of the rich and the poor:

He looked up and saw the rich putting their gifts into the treasury. And He saw a poor widow putting in two small copper coins. And He said, 'Truly I say to you, this poor widow put in more than all of them; for they all out of their surplus put into the offering; but she out of her poverty put in all that she had to live on.'

— Luke 21:1–4

Giving should be out of love and not out of duty:

He will reply, 'I tell you the truth, whatever you did not do for one of the least of these, you did not do for me.'

— Matthew 25:45

In the Apostolic age, Christians were taught that giving alms was an expression of love. Such care for the poor was to be understood as love for God, who, in the person of Jesus Christ, sacrificed himself for the salvation of believers. (Note: James 1:27 (NIV): "Religion that God our Father accepts as pure and faultless is this: to look after orphans and widows in their distress and to keep oneself from being polluted by the world.") Sharing possessions was practised in the church:

Now the full number of those who believed were of one heart and soul, and no one said that any of the things that belonged to him was his own, but they had everything in common.

— Acts 4:32

... there were no needy persons among them. For from time to time those who owned land or houses sold them, brought the money from the sales and put it at the apostles' feet, and it was distributed to anyone who had need. Joseph, a Levite from Cyprus, whom the apostles called Barnabas (which means "son of encouragement"), sold a field he owned and brought the money and put it at the apostles' feet.

— Acts 4:34-37

=== In Western Christianity ===
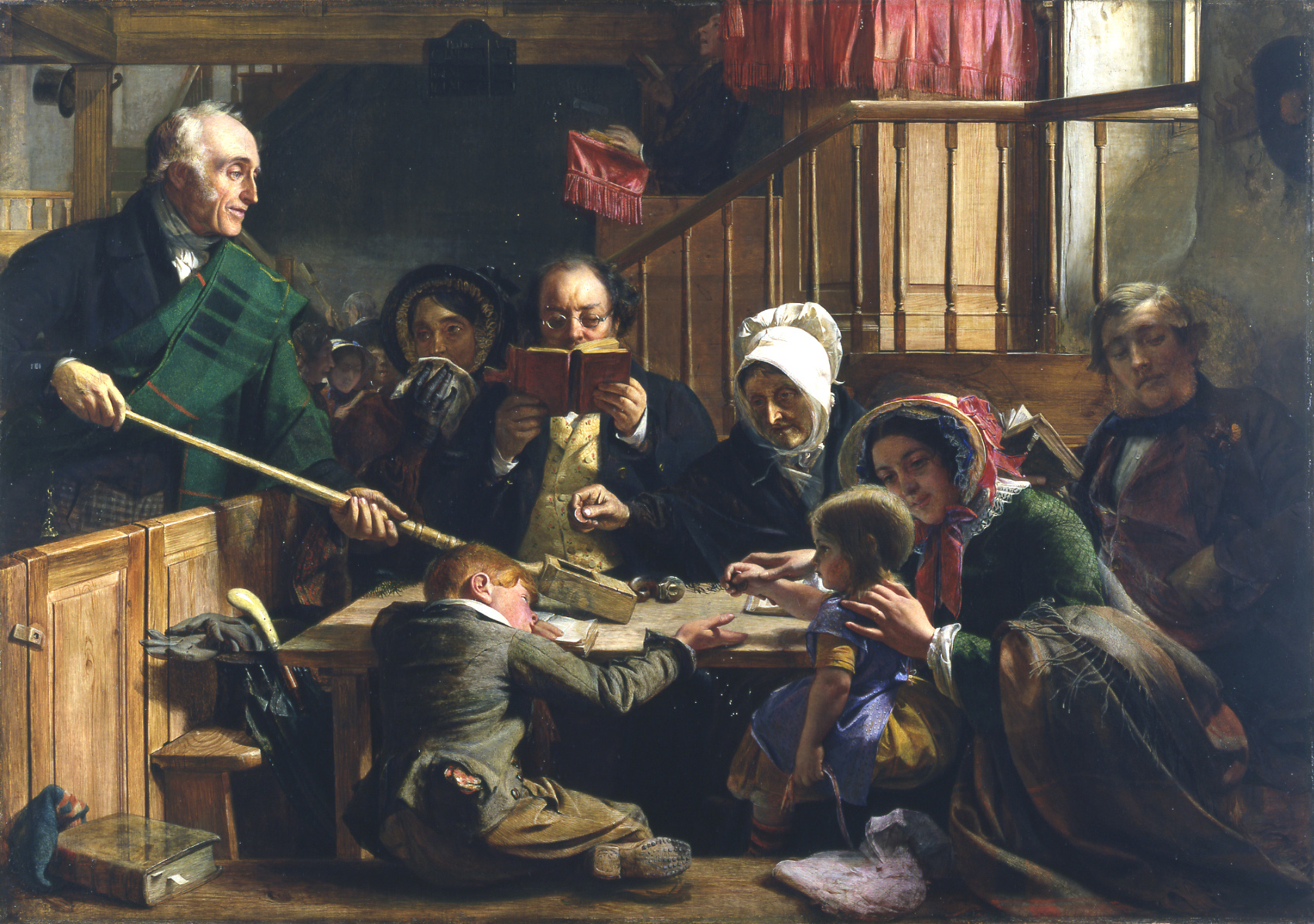
Collecting the Offering in a Scottish Kirk by John Phillip

The offertory is the traditional moment in the Roman Catholic Mass, Lutheran Divine Service, and Anglican Eucharist, when alms are collected. Baptists and Methodists, among other denominations, collect tithes and offerings (alms) during the offertory in church services. A tithe, the first tenth of one's income, is seen as what is owed to God, while an offering (alms) includes anything contributed beyond that. Some fellowships practice regular giving for special purposes called "love offerings" for the poor, destitute or victims of catastrophic loss such as home fires or medical expenses. Traditionally, deacons and deaconesses are responsible for distributing these gifts among widows, orphans, and others in need. Many Christians support a plethora of charitable organizations, not all of which claim a Christian religious affiliation. Many American educational and medical institutions were founded by Christian fellowships giving alms.

For Roman Catholics, alm is a mandatory work of mercy. Pope Leo XIV observes that "almsgiving ... nowadays is not looked upon favorably even among believers", but "we Christians must not abandon almsgiving. It can be done in different ways, and surely more effectively, but it must continue to be done. It is always better at least to do something rather than nothing."

=== In Eastern Christianity ===
In the Eastern Orthodox Church and the Eastern Catholic Churches, the collection of alms and tithes has not been formally united to the offertory in any liturgical action. However, either having a collection plate in the narthex or passing it unobtrusively during the service is not uncommon. In Eastern Orthodox theology, almsgiving is an important part of the spiritual life, and fasting should always be accompanied by increased prayer and almsgiving. Almsgiving in the name of the deceased also frequently accompanies prayer for the dead. Those whose financial circumstances do not permit the giving of monetary alms may give alms in other ways, such as intercessory prayer and acts of mercy such as visiting people in prison, clothing the poor or volunteering in soup kitchens.

== Hinduism ==
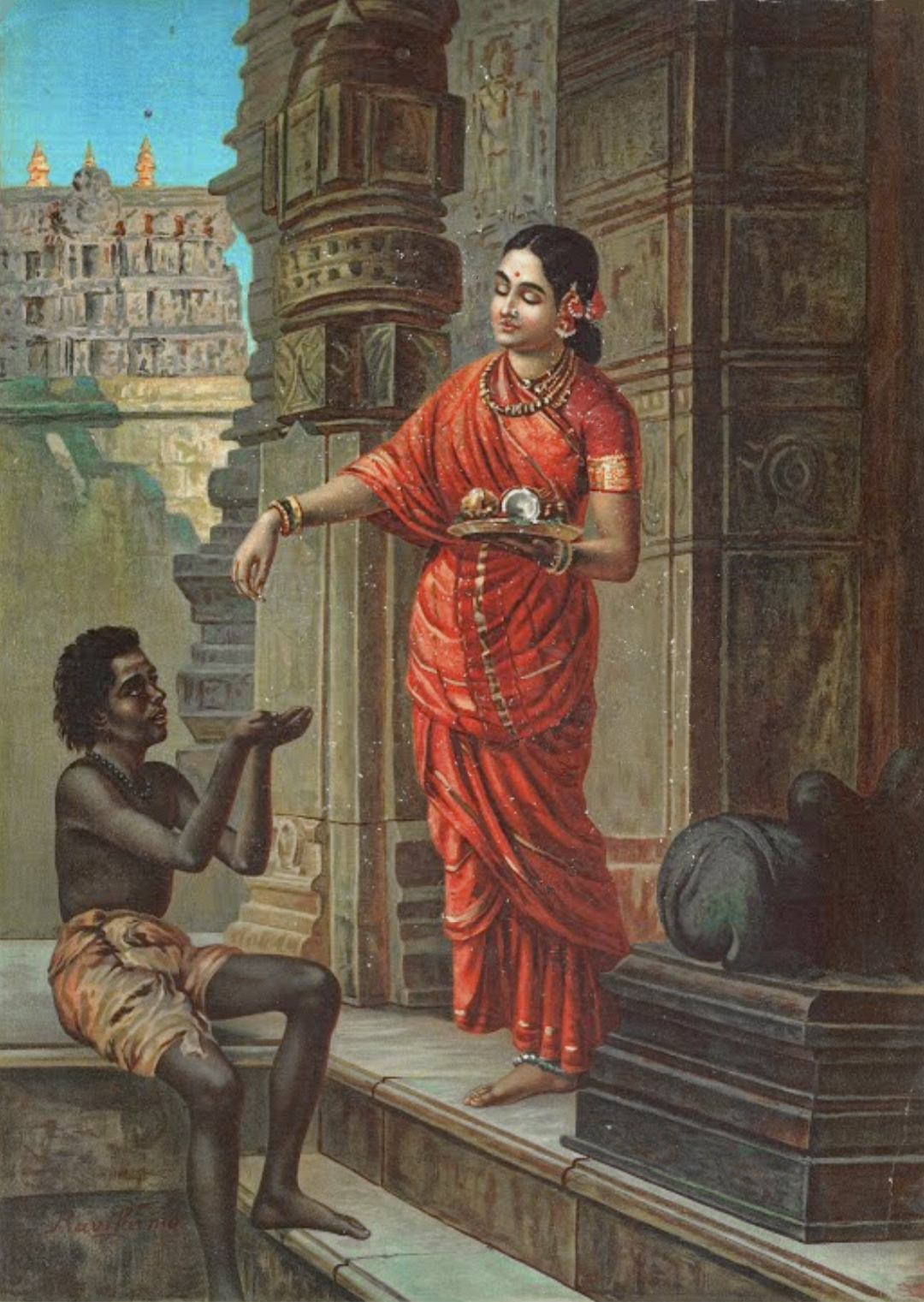
Lady giving alms at the Temple by Raja Ravi Varma (1848–1906)

=== Dāna in Hinduism ===
In Hinduism, dāna (Sanskrit: दान) is an ancient concept of almsgiving dating to the Vedic period of Hinduism. Dāna has been defined in traditional texts as any action of relinquishing the ownership of what one considered or identified as one's own, and investing the same in a recipient without expecting anything in return. While dāna is typically given to one person or family, Hinduism also discusses charity or giving aimed at public benefit, which is sometimes called utsarga. This aims at larger projects such as building a rest house, school, investing in drinking water or an irrigation well, planting trees, and building care facilities, among others. The practice of begging for alms is called bhiksha (Sanskrit: भिक्षा).

The 11th century Persian historian Abū Rayḥān al-Bīrūnī, who visited and lived in India for 16 years beginning in about 1017 CE, mentions the practice of charity and almsgiving among Hindus as he observed during his stay. He wrote, "It is obligatory with them (Hindus) every day to give alms as much as possible."

After the taxes, there are different opinions on how to spend their income. Some destine one-ninth of it for alms. Others divide this income (after taxes) into four portions. One fourth is destined for common expenses, the second for liberal works of a noble mind, the third for alms, and the fourth for being kept in reserve.

— Abū Rayḥān al-Bīrūnī, Tarikh Al-Hind, 11th century AD

Almsgiving in Hinduism is considered a noble deed to be done without expectation of any return from those who receive the charity. Some texts reason, referring to the nature of social life, that charity is a form of good karma that affects one's future circumstances and environment, and that good charitable deeds leads to good future life because of the reciprocity principle. Other Hindu texts, such as Vyasa Samhita, state that reciprocity may be innate in human nature and social functions but dāna is a virtue in itself, as doing good lifts the nature of one who gives. The texts do not recommend charity to unworthy recipients or where charity may harm or encourage injury to or by the recipient. Dāna is thus a dharmic act, requires an idealistic-normative approach, and has spiritual and philosophical context. Some medieval era authors state that dāna is best done with śraddhā (faith), which is defined as being in good will, cheerful, welcoming the recipient of the charity and giving without anasuya (finding faults in the recipient). Kohler states that these scholars of Hinduism suggest that charity is most effective when it is done with delight, a sense of "unquestioning hospitality", where the dāna ignores the short term weaknesses as well as the circumstances of the recipient and takes a long-term view.

==== Institutional dāna ====
Satrams, also called Dharamsala or Chathrams in parts of India, have been one means of almsgiving in Hinduism. Satrams are shelters (rest houses) for travelers and the poor, with many serving water and free food. These were usually established along the roads connecting major Hindu temple sites in south Asia, as well as near major temples. Hindu temples have also served as institutions for almsgiving. The dāna the temples received from Hindus were used to feed people in distress as well as fund public projects such as irrigation and land reclamation.

==== Forms of dāna ====
Forms of almsgiving in Hinduism include:

1. go dāna, the donation of a cow
2. bhu dāna (भू दान), the donation of land
3. vidya dāna or jñāna dāna (विद्या दान, ज्ञान दान), the giving of knowledge and skills
4. aushadhā dāna, the giving of care for the sick and diseased
5. abhay dāna, the giving of freedom from fear (such as asylum or protection for someone facing imminent injury)
6. anna dāna (अन्ना दान), the giving of food to the poor, needy, and all visitors

Between giving food and giving knowledge, Hindu texts suggest the gift of knowledge is superior.

==== In the Vedas ====
The Rigveda has the earliest discussion of dāna in the Vedas and offers reasons for the virtue of almsgiving.

The Gods have not ordained hunger to be our death: even to the well-fed man comes death in varied shape,
The riches of the liberal never waste away, while he who will not give finds none to comfort him,
The man with food in store who, when the needy comes in miserable case begging for bread to eat,
Hardens his heart against him, when of old finds not one to comfort him.

Bounteous is he who gives unto the beggar who comes to him in want of food, and the feeble,
Success attends him in the shout of battle. He makes a friend of him in future troubles,
No friend is he who to his friend and comrade who comes imploring food, will offer nothing.

Let the rich satisfy the poor implorer, and bend his eye upon a longer pathway,
Riches come now to one, now to another, and like the wheels of cars are ever rolling,
The foolish man wins food with fruitless labour: that food – I speak the truth – shall be his ruin,
He feeds no trusty friend, no man to love him. All guilt is he who eats with no partaker.

— Rigveda, 10.117

==== In the Upanishads ====
The early Upanishads, those composed before 500 BCE, discuss the virtue of almsgiving. For example, Brihadaranyaka Upanishad states in verse 5.2.3 that three characteristics of a good, developed person are self-restraint (dama), compassion or love for all sentient life (daya), and charity (dāna). Chandogya Upanishad, similarly, states in Book III that a virtuous life requires tapas (meditation, asceticism), dāna (charity), arjava (straightforwardness, non-hypocrisy), ahimsa (non-violence, non-injury to all sentient beings) and satyavacana (truthfulness). (Note: Translation: Now Tapas (austerity, meditation), Dāna (charity, alms-giving), Arjava (sincerity, uprightness and non-hypocrisy), Ahimsa (non-violence, don't harm others) and Satya-vacanam (truthfulness), these are the Dakshina (gifts, payment to others) he gives [in life]. – Chandogya Upanishad 3.17.4)

==== In Mahabharata and Puranas ====
Bhagavad Gita describes the right and wrong forms of dāna in verses 17.20 through 17.22. The Adi Parva of the Hindu Epic Mahabharata states in Chapter 91 that a person must first acquire wealth by honest means, then embark on charity; be hospitable to those who come to him; never inflict pain on any living being; and share a portion with others whatever he consumes. In the Vana Parva, Chapter 194, the Mahabharata recommends that one must "conquer the mean by charity, the untruthful by truth, the wicked by forgiveness, and dishonesty by honesty".

The Bhagavata Purana discusses when dāna is proper and when it is improper. In Book 8, Chapter 19, verse 36, it states that charity is inappropriate if it endangers and cripples modest livelihood of one's biological dependents or of one's own. Charity from surplus income above that required for modest living is recommended in the Puranas.

== Islam ==
In Islam, the concept of Muhsi or Muhsin alms-giver or charitable giving is generally divided into voluntary giving, ṣadaqah (صدقة), and an obligatory practice, the zakāh (الزكاة). Zakāh is governed by a specific set of rules within Islamic jurisprudence and is intended to fulfill a well-defined set of theological and social requirements. Ṣadaqah is possibly a better translation of Christian influenced formulations of the notion of "alms" for that reason, though zakāh plays a much larger role within Islamic charity.

=== Zakat ===
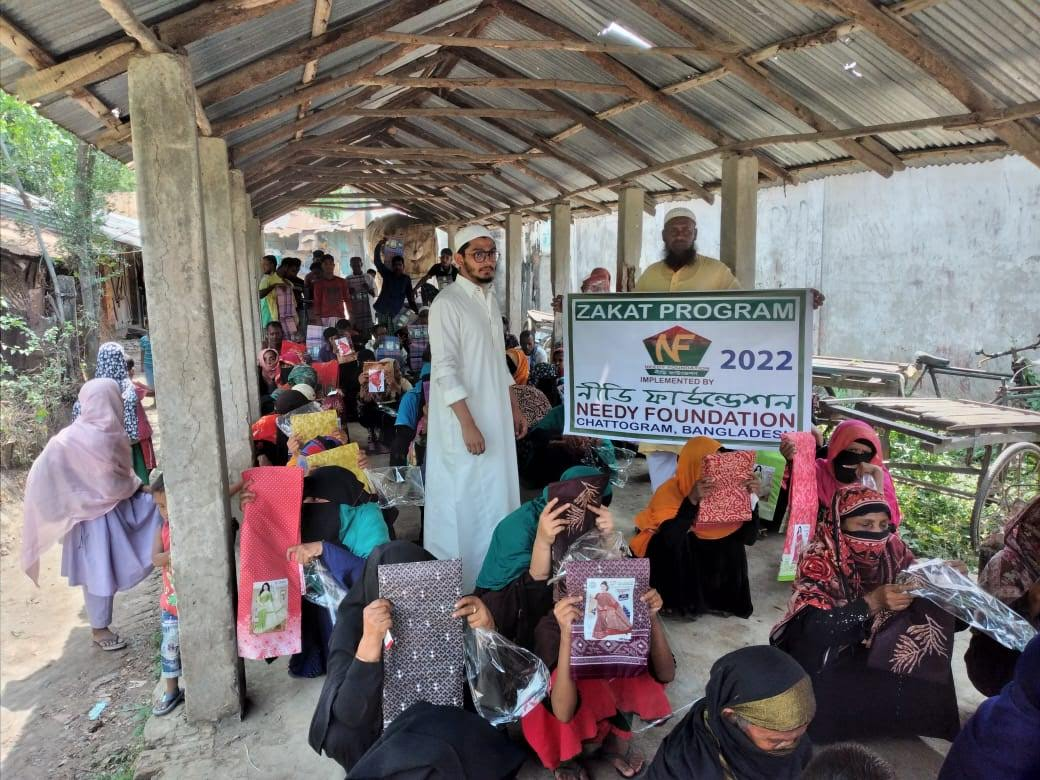
Giving of clothes to the poor as Zakat al-Fitr during the Eid festival in Chittagong, Bangladesh. In Islam, almsgiving is often a communal and polity-building practice.

Zakāh is the third of the five pillars of Islam. The literal meaning of the word zakāh is "to purify", "to develop" and "cause to grow". Zakāh is the amount of money that every Muslim, male or female, who is an adult, mentally stable, free, and financially able, has to pay to support specific categories of people. According to shariah, it is an act of worship. Possessions are purified by setting aside a proportion for those in need. This cutting back, like the pruning of plants, balances and encourages new growth. Various rules are attached but, in general terms, it is obligatory to give 2.5% of one's savings and business revenue and 5–10% of one's harvest to the poor. Possible recipients include the destitute, the working poor, those who are unable to pay off their own debts, stranded travelers and others who need assistance, with the general principle of zakat always being that the rich should pay it to the poor. One of the most important principles of Islam is that all things belong to God and wealth is therefore held by human beings in trust.

This category of people is defined in At-Tawbah:

"The alms are only for the poor and the needy, and those who collect them, and those whose hearts are to be reconciled, and to free the captives and the debtors, and for the cause of Allah, and (for) the wayfarers; a duty imposed by Allah. Allah is knower, Wise."

— Qur'an 9:60

The obligatory nature of zakat is firmly established in the Qur'an, the sunnah (or hadith), and the consensus of the companions and the Muslim scholars. Allah states in At-Tawbah:

"O ye who believe! there are indeed many among the priests and anchorites, who in Falsehood devour the substance of men and hinder (them) from the way of Allah. And there are those who bury gold and silver and spend it not in the way of Allah. announce unto them a most grievous penalty – On the Day when heat will be produced out of that (wealth) in the fire of Hell, and with it will be branded their foreheads, their flanks, and their backs.- "This is the (treasure) which ye buried for yourselves: taste ye, then, the (treasures) ye buried!"

— Qur'an 9:34–35

Muslims of each era have agreed upon the obligatory nature of paying zakat from their gold and silver, and from other kinds of currency.

==== Nisab ====
Zakat is obligatory when a certain amount of money, called the nisab (or minimum amount), is reached or exceeded. Zakat is not obligatory if the amount owned is less than this nisab. The nisab of gold and golden currency is 20 mithqal, or approximately 85 grams of pure gold. One mithqal is approximately 4.25 grams. The nisab of silver and silver currency is 200 dirhams, which is approximately 595 grams of pure silver. The nisab of other kinds of money and currency is to be scaled to that of gold; the nisab of money is equivalent to the price of 85 grams of 999-type (pure) gold on the day in which zakat is paid.

Zakat is obligatory after the money has been in the control of its owner for the span of one lunar year; a lunar year is approximately 355 days. The owner then needs to pay 2.5% (or 1/40) of the money as zakat. The owner should deduct any amount of money he or she borrowed from others, check if the rest reaches the necessary nisab, then pay zakat for it.

If the owner had enough money to satisfy the nisab at the beginning of the year, but his wealth in any form increased, the owner needs to add the increase to the nisab amount owned at the beginning of the year and then pay zakat, 2.5%, of the total at the end of the lunar year. There are minor differences between fiqh schools on how this is to be calculated. Each Muslim calculates his or her own zakat individually. For most purposes, this involves the payment each year of two and a half percent of one's capital.

=== Sadaqah ===
A pious person may also give alms as much as he or she pleases as ṣadaqah, and does so preferably in secret. Although this word can be translated as 'voluntary charity', it has a wider meaning, as illustrated in the hadiths:

The Messenger of Allah said: "Every good is charity. Indeed among the good is to meet your brother with a smiling face, and to pour what is left in your bucket into the vessel of your brother."

— Jamiʽ at-Tirmidhi 27.76, hadith compiled by Al-Tirmidhi

The Prophet said: "Charity is a necessity for every Muslim." He was asked: "What if a person has nothing?" The Prophet replied: "He should work with his own hands for his benefit and then give something out of such earnings in charity." The Companions asked: "What if he is not able to work?" The Prophet said: "He should help poor and needy persons." The Companions further asked "What if he cannot do even that?" The Prophet said "He should urge others to do good." The Companions said "What if he lacks that also?" The Prophet said "He should check himself from doing evil. That is also charity."

— Riyadh as-Salihin 141, hadith compiled by Al-Nawawi

== Judaism ==
=== Tzedakah ===
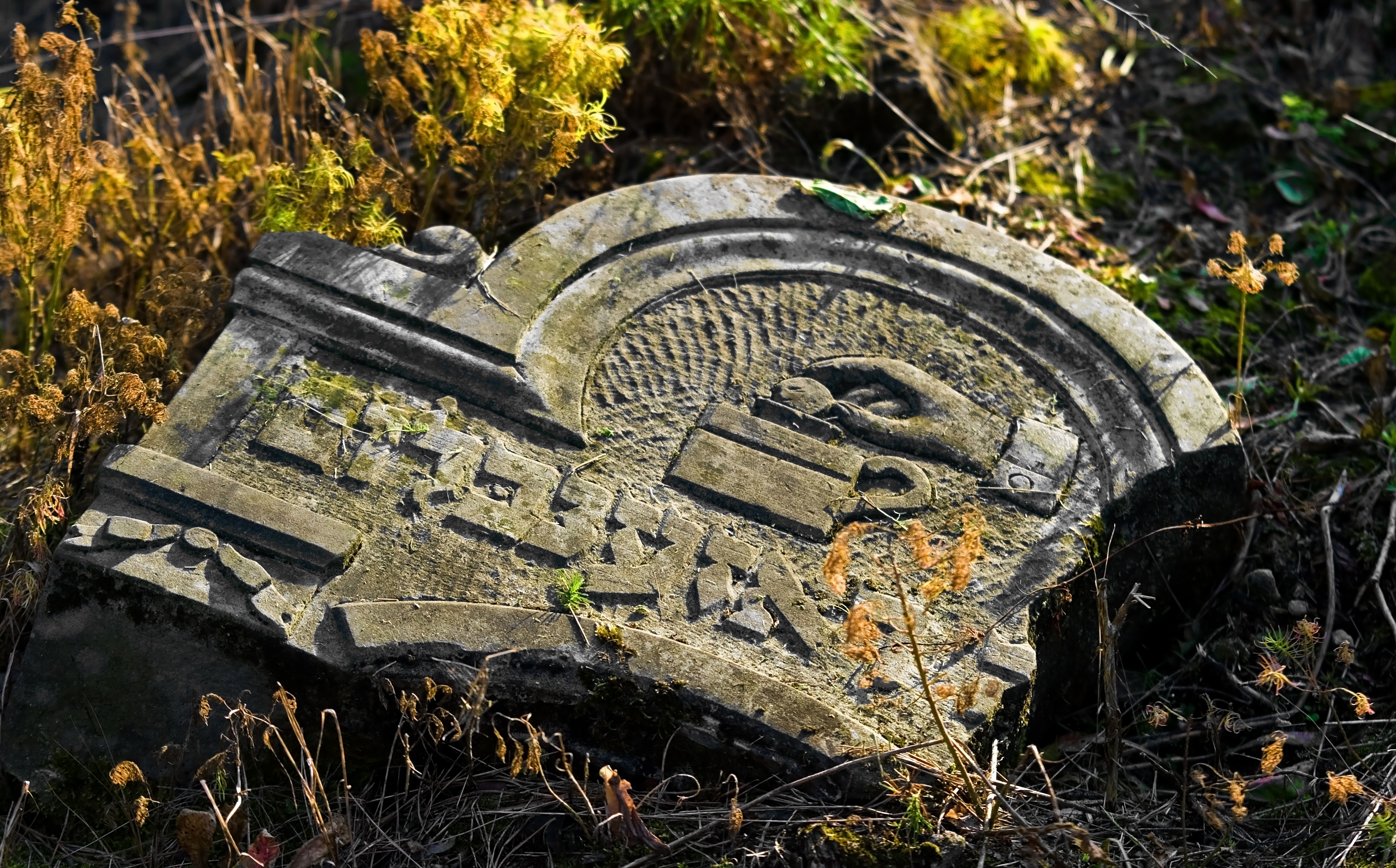
Sandstone vestige of a Jewish gravestone depicting a tzedakah box (pushke) in a Jewish cemetery in Otwock (Karczew-Anielin), Poland.

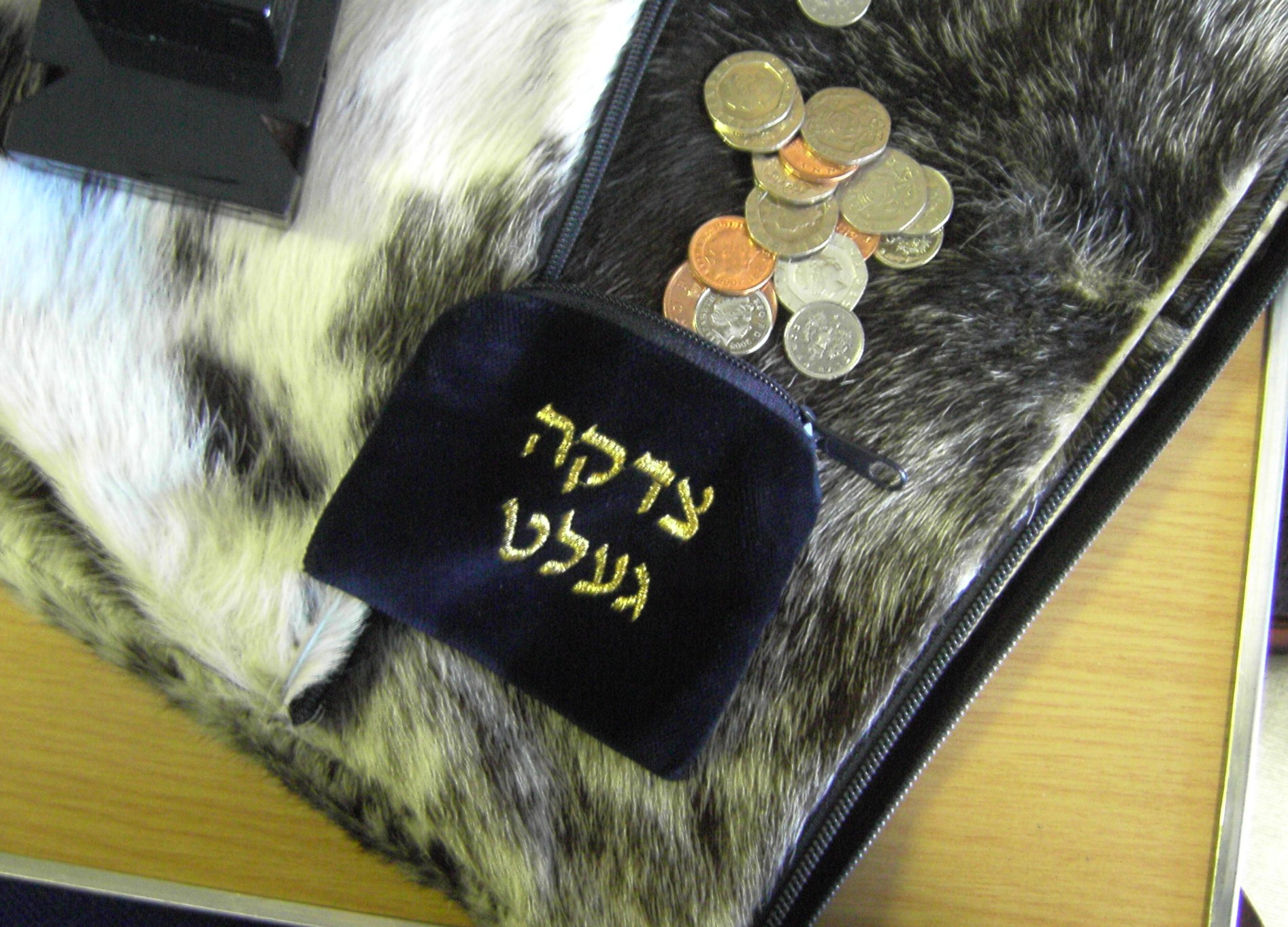
Tzedakah pouch and gelt (Yiddish for coins/money) on fur-like padding.

In Judaism, tzedakah, a Hebrew term literally meaning righteousness but commonly used to signify "charity", refers to the religious obligation to do what is right and just. (Note: "Jews do not practice charity, and the concept is virtually nonexistent in Jewish tradition. Instead of charity, the Jew gives tzedakah, which means 'righteousness' and 'justice.' When the Jew contributes his money, time and resources to the needy, he is not being benevolent, generous or 'charitable.' He is doing what is right and just.") In the Greek Septuagint tzedakah was sometimes translated as ἐλεημοσύνη, "almsgiving".

In Judaism, tzedakah is seen as one of the greatest deeds that a person can do. Tzedakah, along with prayer and repentance, is regarded as ameliorating the consequences of bad acts. Contemporary tzedakah is regarded as a continuation of the Biblical Maaser Ani, or poor-tithe, as well as Biblical practices including permitting the poor to glean the corners of a field, harvest during the Shmita (sabbatical year), and other practices. Jewish farmers are commanded to leave the corners of their fields for the starving to harvest for food and are forbidden to pick up any grain that has been dropped during harvesting, as such food shall be left for the starving as well. (Note: Leviticus 19:9–10 (KJV) "And when ye reap the harvest of your land, thou shalt not wholly reap the corners of thy field, neither shalt thou gather the gleanings of thy harvest. 10 And thou shalt not glean thy vineyard, neither shalt thou gather every grape of thy vineyard; thou shalt leave them for the poor and stranger: I am the LORD your God.")

In the Mishneh Torah, Chapter 10:7–14, Maimonides lists eight "laws about giving to poor people" (hilkhot matanot aniyim), listed in order from most to least righteous, with the most righteous form being allowing an individual to become self-sustaining and capable of giving others charity:

1. Enabling the recipient to become self-reliant.
2. Giving when neither party knows the other's identity.
3. Giving when you know the recipient's identity, but the recipient doesn't know your identity.
4. Giving when you do not know the recipient's identity, but the recipient knows your identity.
5. Giving before being asked.
6. Giving after being asked.
7. Giving less than you should, but giving it cheerfully.
8. Giving begrudgingly.

== Mandaeism ==
=== Zidqa ===
In Mandaeism, zidqa refers to alms or almsgiving. Mandaean priests receive regular financial contributions from laypeople.

The Mandaic term zidqa brika (literally "blessed oblation") refers to a ritual meal blessed by priests. An early self-appellation for Mandaeans is bhiri zidqa, meaning "elect of righteousness".

== See also ==
- Almshouse – Charitable housing
- Begging – Demanding favors in public
- Bhiksha – Sanskrit term for the act of seeking alms
- Freegan – Stance of limited participation in the food system and broader economy in protest
- Mendicant – Person who relies primarily on alms
- Meshulach – Emissary soliciting funds for Jewish settlements in Israel
- Pittance – Small gift
- Qard al-Hassan – Islamic concept of interest-free lending
- Satuditha – Burmese feast and merit-making activity
- Zayat – Type of Burmese pavilion

== Bibliography ==
- Mydans, Seth (20 September 2007). Monks Pressure Myanmar Junta (New York Times). Retrieved 20 September 2007 from "The New York Times
- Nyanatiloka Mahathera (4th ed., 1980). Buddhist Dictionary: Manual of Buddhist Terms and Doctrines. Kandy, Sri Lanka: Buddhist Publication Society. ISBN 955-24-0019-8. Available on-line at Budsas.org
- Pāli Text Society (PTS) (1921–1925). The Pāli Text Society's Pāli-English dictionary. London: Chipstead. Available on-line at Uchicago.edu Archived 2021-07-25 at the Wayback Machine
- Thanissaro Bhikkhu (trans.) (1997). Tanhavagga: Craving (Dhp XXIV). Available on-line at Accesstoinsight.org
- Thanissaro Bhikkhu (trans.) (2001). The Group of Fours (Itivuttaka 4). Available on-line at Accesstoinsight.org
- Tsongkhapa & Alexander Berzin (trans.) (2001). The Abbreviated Points of the Graded Path. Available on-line at StudyBuddhism.com
