= Sigālovāda Sutta =

31st Sutta in the Digha Nikaya, Pāli Canon

Sigālovāda Sutta is the 31st Sutta described in the Digha Nikaya ("Long Discourses of Buddha"). It is also known as the Sīgāla Sutta, the Sīgālaka Sutta, the Siṅgālovāda Sutta, the Siṅgāla Sutta, and the Sigālovāda Suttanta ("The Sigāla Homily").

Buddhaghosa has referred to this sutta as "the Vinaya [Buddhist code of discipline] of the householder." In modern times, Bhikkhu Bodhi has identified this sutta as the "most comprehensive Nikāya text" which pertains "to the happiness directly visible in this present life."

== Sutta summary ==
=== Sigala's honoring his father ===
The Sigalovada Sutta takes place when Buddha encountered a youth called Sigala in his morning stroll. The young man, in drenched attire, prostrated and worshipped the four compass directions (East, South, West, and North), plus the Earth (Down) and the Sky (Up). When asked by Buddha why he did so, the youth Sigala replied that he had been told by his late father to do so and he thought that it was right to uphold his father's wishes. Buddha then, based on Sigala's point of view, taught him how a noble one (Pali: ariya) should worship the Six directions.

=== Avoid evil ways ===
The Buddha first describes fourteen evil ways that should be avoided by a householder. The Buddha enumerates these evil ways to be avoided as:

- the four defilements of action:

1. taking life (panatipata)
2. stealing (adinnadana)
3. sexual misconduct (kamesu micchacara)
4. lying (musavada)

- the four causes of evil action:

1. sensual desire (kama chanda)
2. hate (dosa)
3. ignorance (moha)
4. fear (bhaya)

- the six ways of squandering wealth:

1. indulging in intoxicants
2. wandering the streets at inappropriate times
3. frequenting public spectacle
4. compulsive gambling
5. malevolent companionship
6. habitual idleness

=== Choose true friends ===
The Buddha then elaborated on the importance of having and being a true friend, as he described what true friends are; and what true friends are not; and, how true friends will aid in attaining a blissful life.

=== Protect close relationships ===
Finally, returning to the topic of the six directions, the Buddha described the Four Compass Direction as: parents (East), teachers (South), spouse (West), and friends and colleagues (North), and the two vertical directions as: ascetics (Up) and the Servants (Down). He elaborated on how to respect and support them, and how in turn the Six will return the kindness and support.

The householder's commitments and the reciprocal acts of those he honors, as identified by the Buddha, are represented below in accordance with the four directions on the horizontal plane (east, south, west and north):

North FRIENDS
commitments	reciprocal acts
generosity kind words helpfulness impartiality integrity	supportiveness protect your wealth provide shelter loyalty honor your family

West SPOUSES
commitments	reciprocal acts
honor her respect her fidelity share authority provide gifts	organize duties hospitality fidelity wise budgeting skillfulness

East PARENTS
commitments	reciprocal acts
support them fulfill their duties honor traditions deserve inheritance honor their passing	restrain from evil nurture goodness teach skills arrange marriage provide inheritance

South TEACHERS
commitments	reciprocal acts
rise to greet them attend to them eager receptivity serve them master their teaching	thoroughly instruct ensure comprehension provide well-roundedness provide referrals ensure safety

Nadir WORKERS
commitments	reciprocal acts
apt work just wages health care perks leave time	rise early stay late no stealing work well allegiance

To the left are shown the householder's commitments to and the reciprocal acts of employees and servants (representing the nadir, below the practitioner's body).

To the right are shown the householder's commitments to and the reciprocal acts of religious guides (representing the zenith, above the practitioner's body).

Zenith ASCETICS
commitments	reciprocal acts
loving acts loving speech loving thoughts hospitality material support	restrain from evil nurture goodness lovingkindness enlighten clarify teach goodness

== Contemporary commentaries ==
Bhikkhu Bodhi has contrasted the Buddha's responsibility-reciprocity statements with modern-day social theory, stating:

This practice of 'worshipping the six directions', as explained by the Buddha, presupposes that society is sustained by a network of interlocking relationships that bring coherence to the social order when its members fulfill their reciprocal duties and responsibilities in a spirit of kindness, sympathy, and good will.... Thus, for Early Buddhism, the social stability and security necessary for human happiness and fulfillment are achieved, not through aggressive and potentially disruptive demands for 'rights' posed by competing groups, but by the renunciation of self-interest and the development of a sincere, large-hearted concern for the welfare of others and the good of the greater whole.

== See also ==
- Pāli Canon
- Sutta Piṭaka
- Dīgha Nikāya
- Three Refuges
- Five Precepts
- Noble Eightfold Path
- Spiritual friendship
- Householder (Buddhism)

Related Suttas:

- Dhammika Sutta (Sn 2.14)
- Dighajanu Sutta (AN 8.54)

== Bibliography ==
- Bodhi, Bhikkhu (ed.) (2005), In the Buddha's Words: An Anthology of Discourses from the Pali Canon. Somerville, MA: Wisdom Publications. ISBN 0-86171-491-1.
- Hinüber, Oskar von (2000). A Handbook on Pāli Literature. Berlin: de Gruyter. ISBN 3-11-016738-7.
- Kelly, John, Sue Sawyer & Victoria Yareham (2005). DN 31, Sigalovada Sutta: The Buddha's Advice to Sigalaka. Available on-line at: http://www.accesstoinsight.org/tipitaka/dn/dn.31.0.ksw0.html.
- Law, Bimala Churn (1932–33), "Nirvana and Buddhist Laymen" in the Annals of the Bhandarkar Oriental Research Institute, Vol. 14, 1932-1933, pp. 80–86. Available on-line at: http://ccbs.ntu.edu.tw/FULLTEXT/JR-ENG/lawn.htm.
- Narada Thera (1995). Everyman's Ethics: Four Discourses of the Buddha. Available on-line at: http://www.accesstoinsight.org/lib/authors/narada/wheel014.html.
- Narada Thera (trans.) (1996). DN 31, Sigalovada Sutta: The Discourse to Sigala, The Layperson's Code of Discipline. Available on-line at: http://www.accesstoinsight.org/tipitaka/dn/dn.31.0.nara.html.
- Walshe, Maurice (1995). The Long Discourses of the Buddha: A Translation of the Dīgha Nikāya. Somerville, MA: Wisdom Publications. ISBN 0-86171-103-3.
