= Dīghajāṇu Sutta =

Buddhist text about ethics for lay people

The Dighajanu Sutta (Pali Dīghajāṇu sutta), also known as the Byagghapajja Sutta or Vyagghapajja Sutta ව්‍යග්ඝපජ්ජ සූත්‍රය, is part of the Anguttara Nikaya (AN 8.54). For Theravadin scholars, this discourse of the Pāli Canon is one of several considered key to understanding Buddhist lay ethics. In this discourse, the Buddha instructs a householder named Dīghajāṇu Vyagghapajja, a Koliyan householder, on eight personality traits or conditions that lead to happiness and well-being in this and future lives.

== Text ==
=== Dighajanu seeks householder happiness ===
In this discourse (Pali: sutta), the townsman Dighajanu says to the Buddha the following:

'We are lay people enjoying sensuality; living crowded with spouses & children; using Kasi fabrics & sandalwood; wearing garlands, scents, & creams; handling gold & silver. May the Blessed One teach the Dhamma for those like us, for our happiness & well-being in this life ... [and] in lives to come.'

=== Happiness in this life ===
In response, the Buddha first identifies four traits conducive to happiness (Pali: sukha) in this life:

- hard-working (uṭṭhāna-sampadā), being skilled and diligent in ones livelihood;
- vigilance (ārakkha-sampadā), protecting ones wealth from theft and disaster;
- virtuous friendship (kalyāṇa-mittatā), associating with and emulating those embodying faith, virtue, generosity and wisdom; and,
- balanced living (sama-jīvikatā), abstaining from womanizing, drunkenness, gambling and evil friendships.

In this discourse, the Buddha describes wealth worthy of the householder's protection as being:

'wealth acquired by energetic striving,
amassed by the strength of his arms,
earned by the sweat of his brow,
righteous wealth righteously gained.'

=== Happiness in future lives ===
Regarding four traits conducive to happiness in future lives, the Buddha identifies accomplishments (sampadā) in:

- faith (saddhā), in the fully enlightened Buddha;
- virtue (sīla), as exemplified by the Five Precepts;
- generosity (cāga), giving charity and alms; and,
- wisdom (paññā), having insight into the arising and passing of things.

This discourse ends with the following refrain:

Thus to the layman full of faith,
By him, so truly named 'Enlightened,'
These eight conditions have been told
Which now and after lead to bliss.

== Context ==
This discourse is one of the core texts in the Pali canon for understanding the Buddha's moral expectations of his lay followers.

=== Right conduct ===
Bhikkhu Bodhi describes this discourse as one of "a number of texts dealing with different aspects of household life united by an emphasis on right livelihood" (Pali: sammājiva). Bodhi identifies a common thread among such texts as being an emphasis on right conduct, as exemplified by adherence to the Five Precepts.

In addition to the precepts, as in the Sigalovada Sutta, this discourse also warns against the dangers of libertinism and commends the keeping of good-hearted friends.

=== Understanding kamma ===
In suttas such as this one, Bodhi identifies a second common thread to what might be referred to as the pursuit of a kammic consciousness. Discussing the broader context of Buddhist ethics, Ven. Narada Mahathera states:

The question of incurring the pleasure or displeasure of a God does not enter the mind of a Buddhist. Neither hope of reward nor fear of punishment acts as an incentive to him to do good or to refrain from evil. A Buddhist is aware of future consequences, but he refrains from evil because it retards, does good because it aids progress to Enlightenment....

In this sutta in particular such an awareness is underlined by Dighajanu's concern for happiness in ones future life. Bodhi notes:

For Early Buddhism, the ideal householder is not merely a devout supporter of the monastic order but a noble person who has attained at least the first of the four stages of realization, the fruition of stream-entry (sotāpatti).

=== Wisdom ===
Such a realization on the Buddhist path requires more than ethical business conduct. Narada comments:

Conduct, though essential, is itself insufficient to gain one's emancipation. It should be coupled with wisdom or knowledge (pañña). The base of Buddhism is morality, and wisdom is its apex.

Likewise, in his discourse to Dighajanu, the Buddha identifies wisdom as the ultimate trait for a householder to nurture and embody.

== See also ==
- Three Refuges
- Five Precepts
- Noble Eightfold Path
- Upāsaka and Upāsikā
- Householder (Buddhism)
- Rebirth (Buddhism)
- Spiritual friendship
- Pāli Canon
- Sutta Piṭaka
- Anguttara Nikāya
- Related Suttas:
  - Dhammika Sutta (Sn 2.14)
  - Sigalovada Sutta (DN 31)

== Bibliography ==
- Bodhi, Bhikkhu (2005). In the Buddha's Words: An Anthology of Discourses from the Pali Canon. Boston: Wisdom Publications. ISBN 0-86171-491-1.
- Indaratana Maha Thera, Elgiriye (2002). Vandana: The Album of Pali Devotional Chanting and Hymns. Penang, Malaysia:Mahindarama Dhamma Publication. Available on-line at https://web.archive.org/web/20121114032020/http://www.buddhanet.net/pdf_file/vandana02.pdf.
- Narada Mahathera (1995). Buddhism in a Nutshell. Available on-line at http://www.accesstoinsight.org/lib/authors/narada/nutshell.html.
- Narada [Maha]thera (trans.) (1997). Dighajanu (Vyagghapajja) Sutta: Conditions of Welfare (AN 8.54). Available on-line at http://www.accesstoinsight.org/tipitaka/an/an08/an08.054.nara.html.
- Nyanaponika Thera & Bhikkhu Bodhi (trans.) (1999). Numerical Discourses of the Buddha: An Anthology of Suttas from the Anguttara Nikaya. Walnut Creek, CA: AltaMira Press. ISBN 0-7425-0405-0.
- Rhys Davids, T.W. & William Stede (eds.) (1921-5). The Pali Text Society’s Pali–English dictionary. Chipstead: Pali Text Society. A general on-line search engine for the PED is available at http://dsal.uchicago.edu/dictionaries/pali/.
- Saddhatissa, Hammalawa (1987). Buddhist Ethics. London: Wisdom Publications. ISBN 0-86171-053-3.
- Thanissaro Bhikkhu (trans.) (1995). Dighajanu (Vyagghapajja) Sutta: To Dighajanu (AN 8.54). Available on-line at http://www.accesstoinsight.org/tipitaka/an/an08/an08.054.than.html.
- Thanissaro Bhikkhu (trans.) (1997). Anana Sutta: Debtless (AN 4.62). Available on-line at http://www.accesstoinsight.org/tipitaka/an/an04/an04.062.than.html.
- www.metta.lk (Mettanet-Lanka) (undated). Gotamīvaggo (AN 8.2.6). [Romanized Pali]. Available on-line at https://web.archive.org/web/20170621032625/http://www.metta.lk/tipitaka/2Sutta-Pitaka/4Anguttara-Nikaya/Anguttara5/8-atthakanipata/006-gotamivaggo-p.html. The Vyagghapajja suttaṃ is identified as "8. 2. 6. 4".
