= Dhammika Sutta =

Part of the Sutta Nipata

The Dhammika Sutta is part of the Sutta Nipata(Sn 2.14). In this sutta, the Buddha instructs a lay disciple named Dhammika on rules for monks and on the "layman's rule[s] of conduct" (gahatthavatta).

== Dhammika asks of virtue ==
In the sutta, Dhammika, along with 500 other lay followers (Pali: pancahi upasake-satehi), approaches the Buddha and his monks (Pali: bhikkhavo) and Dhammika asks the Buddha how should a disciple (Pali: sāvako) be virtuous (Pali: sādhu) — both a disciple who has gone from home to homeless (Pali: agārā anagārameti) and a disciple from a household (Pali: agārino ... panupāsakāse). Dhammika then proceeds to extol the Buddha's compassion and wisdom.

== Monastic virtue ==
In response to Dhammika's question, the Buddha first addresses his monks and advises them as follows:

- do alms rounds at the appropriate time
- be rid of interest in the five senses
- return from alms rounds, sit alone and turn inward
- do not slander or blame others or seek out disputation
- care for your food, dwelling and robes but do not become attached to them

== Lay virtue ==
The Buddha notes that a householder's obligations prevent a householder from fully pursuing a monk's path. Thus, the Buddha articulates "the layman's duty" (Pali: gahatthavatta), what are essentially the Five Precepts, as follows:

1. Do not kill or hurt living things or incite others to kill
2. Avoid taking what is not given or inciting others to do so
3. Observe celibacy or at least do not have sex with another's wife
4. Do not lie or incite others to lie
5. Do not drink or incite others to drink intoxicants

For the Uposatha, the Buddha extols the practice of the Eight Precepts, which involve the aforementioned Five Precepts (with celibacy alone identified for the third precept) and the following three precepts added:

- Do not eat at inappropriate times (traditionally meaning, one meal before noon)
- Do not wear garlands or perfumes
- Sleep at floor level

The Buddha further stated that, when celebrating the Uposatha, with a purified heart (Pali: pasanna citto) and rejoicing mind (Pali: anumodamāno), the wise (Pali: viññu) share their food and drink with monks of the Sangha.

In the sutta's last verse, the Buddha advises that, if a lay person supports their parents and engaging in fair trading, they will be reborn among self-radiant devas.

== See also ==
- Three Refuges
- Five Precepts
- Eight Precepts
- Noble Eightfold Path
- Uposatha
- Upasaka
- Householder (Buddhism)
- Buddhist ethics
- Buddhist economics
- Related Suttas:
  - Dighajanu Sutta (AN 8.54)
  - Sigalovada Sutta (DN 31)

== Bibliography ==
- Ireland, John D. (trans.) (1983a). Dhammika Sutta: Dhammika (excerpt) [Sn 2.14]. Available on-line at http://www.accesstoinsight.org/tipitaka/kn/snp/snp.2.14.irel.html. (In regards to this being an "excerpt," Ireland translates the entire sutta except for Dhammika's extensive celebratory homage to the Buddha in the sutta's beginning.)
- Ireland, John D. (1983b). The Discourse Collection: Selected Texts from the Sutta Nipata. Available on-line at http://www.accesstoinsight.org/lib/authors/ireland/wheel082.html.
- Pali Text Society (PTS) (1921–25). The Pali Text Society's Pali-English Dictionary (PED). London:Chipstead. The entry on "gaha-tta-vatta" is available on-line at . A general on-line search engine for the PED is available at http://dsal.uchicago.edu/dictionaries/pali/.
- www.metta.lk (Mettanet-Lanka) (undated[a]). Dhammikasutta: The disciple Dhammika [English]. Available on-line at http://www.metta.lk/tipitaka/2Sutta-Pitaka/5Khuddaka-Nikaya/05Suttanipata/2-cula-vagga-e.html#Dhammikasutta. The so-called "layman's rule of conduct" (here referred to as "the behaviour of disciples from a household ") starts at verse 393.
- www.metta.lk (Mettanet-Lanka) (undated[b]). Dhammikasuttam [Romanized Pali]. Available on-line at http://www.metta.lk/tipitaka/2Sutta-Pitaka/5Khuddaka-Nikaya/05Suttanipata/2-culla-vagga-p.html#Dhammikasutta. The so-called "layman's rule of conduct" (Gahatthavattam) starts at verse 395.
