= List of Buddhists =

This is a list of notable Buddhists, encompassing all the major branches of the religion (i.e. in Buddhism), and including interdenominational and eclectic Buddhist practitioners. This list includes both formal teachers of Buddhism, and people notable in other areas who are publicly Buddhist or who have espoused Buddhism.

== Philosophers and founders of schools ==
Individuals are grouped by nationality, except in cases where their influence was felt elsewhere. Gautama Buddha and his immediate disciples ('Buddhists') are listed separately from later Indian Buddhist thinkers, teachers and contemplatives.

=== Buddha's disciples and early Buddhists ===
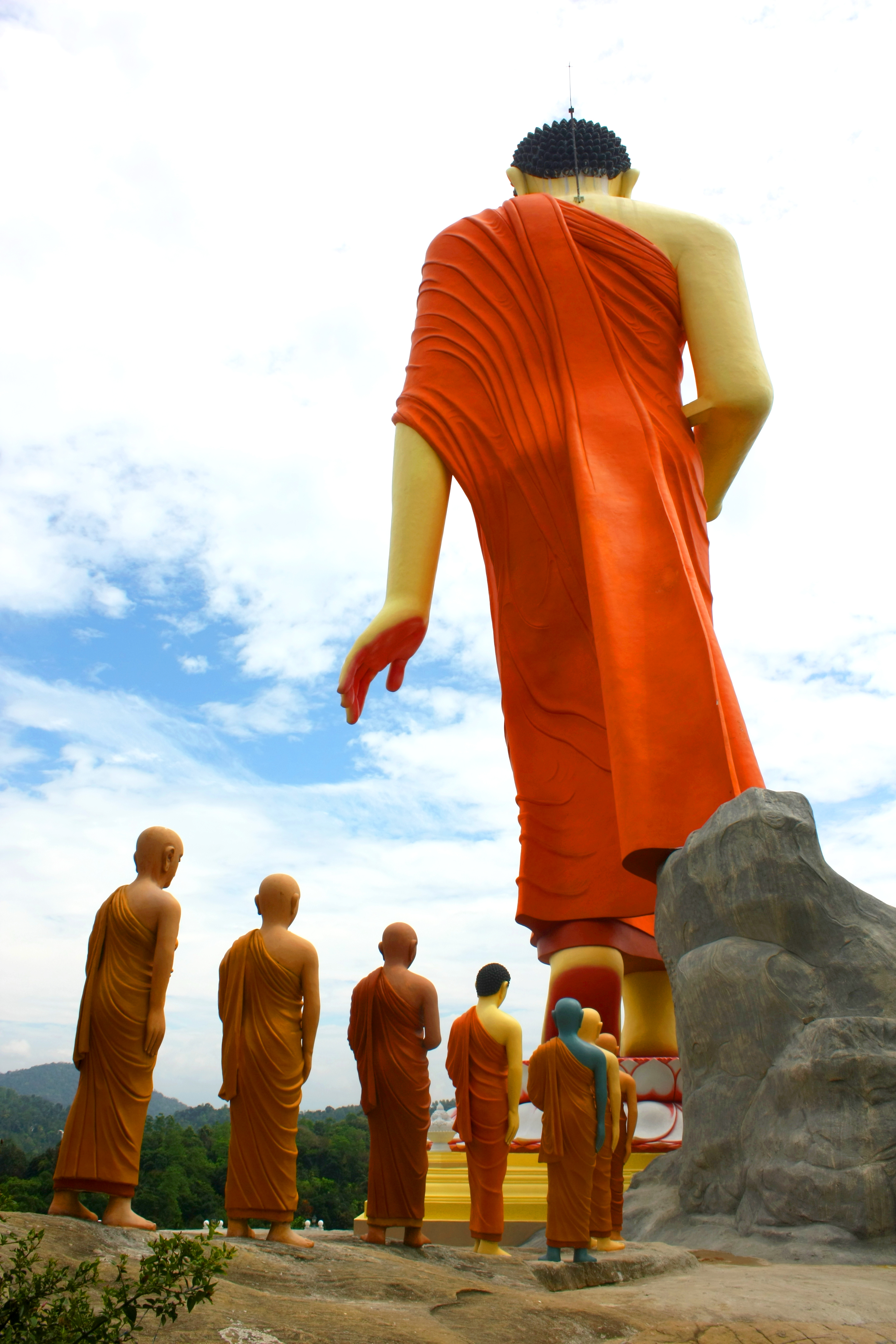
Buddha and his disciples; the world's tallest walking statue of the Buddha, in Kandy, Sri Lanka

- Gautama Buddha, Siddhārtha Gautama

Clergy

- Ānanda, the Buddha's cousin, personal attendant of the Buddha and a chief disciple
- Aṅgulimāla, serial killer who attained to sainthood after renouncing wickedness
- Anuruddhā, one of the ten principal disciples
- Aśvajit, one of the first five disciples of the Buddha
- Devadatta, another cousin of Siddhārtha and later rival who attempted to assassinate the Buddha
- Kātyāyana, foremost in explaining the Dharma
- Kaundinya (also known as Kondañña or Ājñātakauṇḍinya), the first arhat and one of the first five disciples of the Buddha
- Khemā, a chief of the women disciples
- Kisā Gautamī
- Mahākāśyapa
- Mahāprajāpatī Gautamī, Buddha's aunt and foster mother, as well as the first woman to be ordained
- Maudgalyāyana, one of two chief disciples of the Buddha
- Nanda, younger half-brother of the Buddha
- Paṭācārā
- Piṇḍola Bhāradvāja
- Pūrṇamaitrāyaṇīputra, one of the ten principal disciples
- Rāhula, son of Siddhārtha and Yasodharā
- Revata
- Śāriputra one of two chief disciples of the Buddha
- Subhūti, one of the ten principal disciples
- Sundarī Nandā, the Buddha's half-sister
- Sunīta, a low-caste man who reached enlightenment
- Upāli, foremost disciple in knowledge of the Vinaya
- Utpalavarṇā
- Yasodharā, Siddhārtha's wife before he renounced the palace life

Laity

- Amrapali, royal courtesan who donated her mango grove, Ambapali vana to the Order
- Anathapindika, wealthy merchant, banker and the chief male patron
- Ajātasattu, King of Magadha and the son of King Bimbisāra
- Bimbisāra, King of Magadha
- Chandaka, prince Siddhārtha's charioteer
- Citta, wealthy merchant and chief lay male disciple of the Buddha and an Anāgāmi
- Cunda Kammāraputta, a smith who gave the Buddha his last meal
- Hatthaka of Alavi, chief lay male disciple of the Buddha and an Anāgāmi
- Khujjuttara, one of the Buddha's foremost female lay disciples and the servant of Queen Samavati
- Pasenadi, King of Kosala
- Samavati, one of the queens of King Udena of Kosambi and a Sotāpanna
- Śuddhodana, leader of the Shakya clan and father of the Buddha
- Velukandakiya, lay female disciple
- Viśākhā, an aristocratic woman and chief female patron

=== Later Indian Buddhists (after Buddha) ===
- Aryadeva, foremost disciple of Nagarjuna, continued the philosophical school of Madhyamaka
- Aśvaghoṣa, Sarvāstivāda Buddhist philosopher, dramatist, poet and orator from India
- Atiśa, holder of the "mind training" teachings, considered an indirect founder of the Gelug school of Tibetan Buddhism
- B. R. Ambedkar, founder of Navayāna
- Bhāviveka, early expositor of the Svatantrika branch of the Madhyamaka school
- Bodhidharma, founder of Chan Buddhism
- Bodhiruci, patriarch of the Dilun (Chinese: 地論) school
- Batuo, founding abbot and patriarch of the Shaolin Monastery
- Buddhaghosa, Theravadin commentator
- Buddhapālita, early expositor of the Prasaṅgika branch of the Madhyamaka school
- Chandragomin, renowned grammarian
- Candrakīrti, considered the greatest exponent of Prasaṅgika
- Dharmakirti, famed logician, author of the Seven Treatises; student of Dignāga's student, Īśvārasēna; said to have debated famed Hindu scholar Adi Shankara
- Dharmakīrtiśrī, author of the "Wheel of Sharp Weapons" in what is believed to be modern Sumatra, Malay, or Burma
- Dignāga, famed logician
- Kamalaśīla (8th century), author of important texts on meditation
- Kumārajīva, Buddhist monk, scholar, missionary and translator from the Kingdom of Kucha, Central Asia
- Luipa, one of the eighty-four tantric Mahasiddhas
- Nagarjuna, founder of the Madhyamaka school, widely considered the most important Mahayana philosopher (with Asanga)
- Nadapada (Tibetan: Naropa), Tilopa's primary disciple, teacher of Marpa the Translator and Khungpo Nyaljor
- Saraha, famed mahasiddha, forefather of the Kagyu lineage
- Śāntarakṣita, abbot of Nalanda, founder of the Yogacara who helped Padmasambhava establish Buddhism in Tibet
- Shantideva (8th century), author of the Bodhisattvacaryāvatāra
- Śīlabhadra, Buddhist monk and philosopher and erstwhile abbot of Nālandā University in India
- Tilopa, recipient of four separate transmissions from Nagarjuna, Nagpopa, Luipa, and Khandro Kalpa Zangmo; Naropa's teacher

=== Indo-Greek ===
- Dharmaraksita (3rd century BCE), Greek Buddhist missionary sent by emperor Ashoka, and a teacher of the monk Nagasena
- Mahadharmaraksita (2nd century BCE), Greek Buddhist master during the time of Menander
- Nāgasena (2nd century BCE), Buddhist sage questioned about Buddhism by Milinda, the Indo-Greek king in the Milinda Pañha

=== Central Asian ===
- An Shigao, Parthian monk and the first known Buddhist missionary to China, in 148 CE
- Dharmarakṣa, Yuezhi monk, the first known translator of the Lotus Sutra into Chinese
- Jñānagupta (561–592), monk and translator from Gandhara
- Kumārajīva (c. 401), Kuchan monk and one of the most important translators
- Lokaksema, Kushan monk from Gandhara, first translator of Mahayana scriptures into Chinese, around 180 CE
- Prajñā (c. 810), monk and translator from Gandhara, who translated important texts into Chinese and educated the Japanese Kūkai in Sanskrit texts

=== Chinese ===
- Baizhang Huaihai, Zen Buddhist master of Tang dynasty
- Bodhidharma, first patriarch of Chan Buddhism in China
- Dahui Zonggao, 12th-century kōan master
- Daman Hongren, fifth patriarch of Chan Buddhism in China
- Dayi Daoxin, fourth patriarch of Chan Buddhism in China
- Dazu Huike, second patriarch of Chan Buddhism in China
- Faxian, translator and pilgrim
- Fazang, the third of the five patriarchs of the Huayan school of Mahayana Buddhism, of which he is traditionally considered the founder.
- Guifeng Zongmi, fifth patriarch of the Huayan school
- Hong Yi, calligraphist, painter, master of seal carving
- Huangbo Xiyun, 9th-century teacher of Linji Yixuan
- Huineng, sixth and last patriarch of Chan Buddhism in China
- Ingen, 17th-century Chinese Chan monk, founder of the Ōbaku sect of Zen
- Ji Gong, Buddhist monk revered as a deity in Taoism
- Jizang, founder of East Asian Mādhyamaka
- Jnanayasas, translator
- Linji Yixuan, 9th-century Chinese monk, founder of the Linji school of Chan Buddhism
- Mazu Daoyi, 8th-century Chan master
- Moheyan, 8th-century Chinese monk, advocate of "sudden" enlightenment
- Sanghapala, 6th-century monk (Mon-Khmer?) who translated many texts to Chinese
- Sengcan, third patriarch of Chan Buddhism in China
- Wumen Huikai, author of the Gateless Gate
- Xuanzang, brought Yogacara to China to found the East Asian Yogācāra school; significant pilgrim, translator
- Xueting Fuyu, 13th-century Shaolin Monastery abbot of the Caodong school
- Yijing, pilgrim and translator
- Yunmen Wenyan, founder of one of the five schools of Chan Buddhism
- Yuquan Shenxiu, Tang dynasty, patriarch of "Northern School" sect of Chan Buddhism
- Zhaozhou, 9th-century Chan master; noted for "Mu" koan
- Zhiyi, founder of the Tiantai school

=== Tibetan ===
- Gampopa, student of Jetsun Milarepa and founder of the Karma Kagyu lineage of Tibetan Buddhism
- Jigten Sumgön, founder of Drikung Kagyu Lineage
- Dolpopa Sherab Gyaltsen, founder of the Jonang school and advocate of the shentong philosophy
- Jamyang Khyentse Wangpo (1820–1892), leader of Rime (nonsectarian) movement
- Longchenpa, one of the greatest Nyingma philosophers
- Mandarava, important female student and consort of Padmasambhava
- Marpa Lotsawa, student of Naropa and a founder of the Kagyu lineage of Tibetan Buddhism
- Milarepa, foremost student of Marpa Lotsawa
- Padmasambhava, founder of Nyingma school of Tibetan Buddhism
- Karmapa, the founder of Karma Kagyu or Kamtsang Kagyu lineage of Tibetan Buddhism
- Jamgon Kongtrul, Tibetan Buddhist scholar, artist, physician and polymath and leader in Rime movement
- Sakya Pandita, one of the greatest Sakya philosophers
- Taranatha, important Jonang scholar
- Je Tsongkhapa, 14th-century Tibetan monk, founder of the Gelug school of Tibetan Buddhism, based upon the Kadam
- Yeshe Tsogyal, important female student and consort of Padmasambhava
- Rongzom Mahapandita, important Nyingma scholar and meditation master of Nyingma lineage of Tibetan Buddhism

=== Japanese ===
- Bankei Yōtaku (1622–1693), Zen master of the Rinzai school
- Dōgen Zenji (1200–1253), founder of the Sōtō school of Zen, based upon the Caodong school
- Eisai (1141–1215), travelled to China and returned to found the Rinzai school of Zen
- Hakuin Ekaku (1686–1769), Rinzai school of Zen
- Hōnen (1133–1212), founder of the Jōdo-shū school of Pure Land Buddhism
- Ikkyū (1374–1481), Zen Buddhist monk and poet
- Ippen (1234–1289), founder of the Ji-shū sect of Pure Land Buddhism
- Kūkai (774–835), founder of Shingon Buddhism
- Myōe (1173–1232), monk of Kegon and Shingon Buddhism, known for his propagation of the Mantra of Light
- Nakahara Nantenbō (1839–1925), Zen master and artist
- Nichiren (1222–1282), founder of Nichiren Buddhism
- Nikkō (1246–1333), founder of Nichiren Shōshū
- Rōben (689–773), invited Simsang to Japan and founded the Kegon tradition based upon the Korean Hwaeom school
- Ryōkan (1758–1831), Zen monk and poet
- Saichō (767–822), founded Tendai school in Japan, also known by the posthumous title Dengyō Daishi
- Shinran (1173–1263), founder of the Jōdo Shinshū school of Pure Land Buddhism and disciple of Hōnen
- Takuan Sōhō (1573–1645), Zen teacher, and, according to legend, mentor of the swordsman Miyamoto Musashi
- Gempō Yamamoto (1866–1961), Zen master
- Shinjō Itō (1906–1989), founder of Shinnyo-en

=== Korean ===
- Gihwa (1376–1433), Korean Seon monk; wrote commentaries on the Diamond Sutra and Sutra of Perfect Enlightenment
- Jinul, Korean Seon monk (1158–1210); founder of modern Korean gong'an meditation system
- Uisang (7th century), Korean monk, founder of Hwaeom tradition, based upon the Chinese Huayan school
- Woncheuk
- Wonhyo (617–668), Korean monk; prolific commentator on Mahayana sutras

=== Burmese ===
- Shin Arahan (1034–1115), Thathanabaing of the Pagan Kingdom from 1056 to 1115
- Taunggwin Sayadaw (1844–1938) last Buddhist monk to hold the official title of Thathanabaing of Burma
- Ledi Sayadaw (1846–1923), scholarly monk and propagator of Vipassanā meditation
- Mingun Jetawun Sayādaw (1868–1955), one of the key figures in the revival of Vipassanā meditation
- Sunlun Sayadaw (1878 - 1952), renowned Vipassanā meditation master and popular meditation teacher among the monks
- Webu Sayadaw (1896–1977), renowned Vipassanā meditation master
- Mogok Sayadaw (1899–1962), renowned Vipassanā meditation master
- Mahasi Sayadaw (1904–1982), who had significant impact on the Vipassana movement in the West and throughout Asia
- Thamanya Sayadaw (1910–2003), Buddhist monk of Pa-O descent and best known for his doctrinal emphasis on metta
- Mingun Sayadaw (1911–1993), best known for his memory skills and his important role in the Sixth Buddhist Council, awarded the title of Tipitakadhara, meaning Keeper and Guardian of the Tipitaka
- Panditarama Sayadaw (1921–2016), renowned Vipassanā meditation master who taught many Western meditation teachers and students
- Chanmyay Sayadaw (born 1928), well-known monk and editor of the Buddhist scriptures in Pali for the Sixth Buddhist Council
- Sayadaw U Pannavamsa (1928–2017), well known for his missionary work, the abbot of Dhammikarama Burmese Temple in Penang and Burmese Buddhist Temple (Singapore)
- Vijjotārum Sayadaw (1930–2022), Buddhist monk who was the 15th Thathanabaing and Mahanayaka of the Shwekyin Nikaya, ovādācariya of Kaba Aye Pagoda
- Maha Bodhi Ta Htaung Sayadaw (1931–2006), founder of Maha Bodhi Tahtaung and planted many thousands of Bodhi trees, built thousands of pagodas and Buddha statues
- Sitagu Sayadaw (born 1937), his organisation funded many social projects, including water pumps, construction of hospitals, also the founder of Sitagu International Buddhist Academy
- Ashin Nandamalabhivamsa (born 1940), renowned scholarly monk and specialise in Abhidhamma, the rector of International Theravada Buddhist Missionary University
- Pa-Auk Sayadaw (born 1956), renowned Vipassanā meditation master and the abbot of Pa-Auk Forest Monastery
- Taung Galay Sayadaw (born 1960), Buddhist monk of Karen descent, was awarded the honor of Agga Maha Kammatthanacariya
- Ashin Abhijātābhivaṃsa (1968–2022), the 12th recipient of the title of Tipiṭakadhara Dhammabhaṇḍāgārika

Laity

- Sayagyi U Ba Khin (1899–1971), propagator of Vipassanā meditation in the Ledi tradition and founder of the International Meditation Centre
- Daw Mya Thwin (1925–2017), who has established centres for vipassana meditation worldwide

=== Thai ===
- Somdet Phra Buddhacarya (1788–1872), monk who was the preceptor and teacher of King Rama IV
- Somdet Phra Maha Samana Chao Kromma Phraya (1809 –1892), 8th Supreme Patriarch of Thailand
- Somdet Phra Ariyavangsagatayana Somdet Phra Sangharaja (1812–1899), the 9th Supreme Patriarch of Thailand from 1893 to 1899
- Ajahn Sao Kantasīlo (1859–1942), one of the pioneers of the Dhammayuttika Nikaya, mentor of Ajahn Mun
- Somdet Phramahasamanachao Kromphraya Vajirananavarorasa (1860–1921), the 10th Supreme Patriarch of Thailand from 1910 to 1921, who helped to institutionalize Thai Buddhism
- Ajahn Mun Bhūridatta (1870–1949), monk who established the Thai Forest Tradition or "Kammaṭṭhāna tradition"
- Khruba Siwichai (1878–1939), best known for the building of many temples during his time, his charismatic and personalistic character
- Luang Pu Sodh Candasaro (1884–1959), monk who founded the Dhammakaya Movement in the early 20th century
- Luang Pu Waen Suciṇṇo (1887–1985), first-generation student of the Thai Forest Tradition
- Somdet Phra Ariyavangsagatayana Somdet Phra Sangharaja (1896–1973), the 17th Supreme Patriarch of Thailand from 1972 to 1973
- Somdet Phra Ariyavangsagatayana (1897–1971), the 16th Supreme Patriarch of Thailand from 1965 to 1971
- Somdet Phra Sangharaja Chao Krommaluang Jinavajiralongkorn (1897–1988), the 18th Supreme Patriarch of Thailand from 1973 to 1988
- Phra Phimontham (1901–1992), well-known monk and proponent of vipassana meditation
- Phra Ajaan Thate Desaransi (1902–1994), first-generation student of the Thai Forest Tradition and one of the founding teachers of the lineage
- Buddhādasa Bhikkhu (1906–1993), famous and influential Thai ascetic-philosopher of the 20th century
- Ajahn Lee Dhammadharo (1907–1961), regarded as one of the great teachers and meditation masters of the Thai Forest Tradition
- Ajahn Maha Bua (1913–2011), well-known monk in the Thai Forest Tradition
- Somdet Phra Sangharaja Chao Krommaluang Vajirañāṇasaṃvara (1913–2013), the 19th Supreme Patriarch of Thailand from 1989 to 2013
- Ajahn Fuang Jotiko (1915–1986), student of Ajahn Lee, well-known monk in the Thai Forest Tradition
- Ajahn Chah (1918–1992), monk well known for his students from all over the world
- Ajahn Suwat Suvaco (1919–2002), student of Ajahn Funn and established four monasteries in the United States
- Ajahn Tong Sirimangalo (1923–2019), abbot of Wat Phra That Si Chom Thong and a leading figure in the international spread of vipassanā meditation
- Phra Chanda Thawaro (1922–2012), student of Ajahn Mun, one of the best known Thai Buddhist monks of the late 20th and early 21st centuries
- Somdet Phra Ariyavongsagatanana IX (born 1927), the 20th and current Supreme Patriarch of Thailand, practitioner of the Thai Forest Tradition
- Upali Thera, Thai Buddhist monk and founder of the Siam Nikaya Order in Sri Lanka. He visited Kandy in 1753 and there performed Upasampadā.

=== Sri Lankan ===
- Weliwita Sri Saranankara Thero (1698–1778), the last Sangharaja of Sri Lanka
- Ambagahawatte Indrasabhawara Gnanasami Maha Thera (1832–1886), the founder and first Maha Nayaka Thera of Rāmañña Nikāya
- Sri Piyaratana Tissa Mahanayake Thero (1826–1907), Mahanayaka Thero of the Amarapura Nikaya (circa 1860s), and the Sanganayake of the Southern Province

== Rulers and monarchs ==
- Anawrahta (1015–1078), founder of the Pagan Kingdom and credited with introducing Theravada Buddhism there and reintroducing it in Ceylon
- Ashoka (304–232 BC), Mauryan Emperor of ancient India, and the first Buddhist ruler to send Buddhist missionaries outside of India throughout the Old World
- Brihadratha Maurya, last ruler of the Maurya Empire
- Bayinnaung Kyawhtin Nawrahta (1516–1581), king of the Toungoo Dynasty, assembled the largest empire in the history of Southeast Asia, viewed himself as the protector of Theravada Buddhism, and had long tried to promote and protect the religion in Ceylon, introduced more orthodox Theravada Buddhism to Upper Burma and the Shan states, prohibited all human and animal sacrifices throughout the kingdom
- Harsha (606–648), Indian emperor who converted to Buddhism
- Jayavarman VII (1181–1219), king of Cambodia
- Kanishka the Great, ruler of the Kushan Empire
- Kublai Khan, Mongol khagan and founder of the Yuan dynasty of China
- Hulagu Khan, Mongol ruler who conquered much of Southwest Asia, he converted to Buddhism on his deathbed, spending most of his life as a Nestorian Christian
- Menander I (Pali: Milinda), 2nd century BCE, a king of the Indo-Greek Kingdom of Northwestern India who questioned Nāgasena about Buddhism in the Milinda Pañha and is said to have become an arhat
- Mindon Min (1808–1878), penultimate King of Burma and facilitator of the Fifth Buddhist council
- Emperor Ming of Han (28–75), born Liu Yang and also known as Liu Zhuang and as Han Mingdi, the second emperor of China's Eastern Han dynasty.
- Mongkut, king of Thailand and founder of the Dhammayuttika Nikaya
- Prince Shōtoku (574–622), mythologized crown prince and regent of Japan
- Theodorus (1st century BCE), Indo-Greek governor, author of a Buddhist dedication
- Wu Zetian (625–705), only female Empress Regnant in Chinese history
- Emperor Wu of Liang (梁武帝) (502–549) was the founding emperor of the Chinese Liang dynasty, during the Northern and Southern dynasties period.
- Devanampiya Tissa of Anuradhapura (307 BCE–267 BCE), King of Anuradhapura
- Dutugamunu of Anuradhapura (161 BCE–131 BCE), King of Sri Lanka
- Bimbisar (544–492 BC), founder of Haryanka dynasty
- Ajātasattu (reign c. 492–460 BC), second emperor of Haryanka dynasty
- Udayin (460–444 BC), third emperor of Haryanka dynasty
- Pasenadi, King of Kosala

== Modern teachers ==
=== Theravada teachers ===
- Achan Sobin S. Namto (born 1931)
- Ajahn Amaro (born 1956)
- Ajahn Buddhadasa Bhikkhu (1906–1993)
- Ajahn Brahm (born 1951)
- Ajahn Candasiri (born 1947)
- Ajahn Chah (1918–1992)
- Ajahn Jayasaro (born 1958)
- Ajahn Khemadhammo (born 1944)
- Ajahn Mun Bhuridatta (1870–1949)
- Ajahn Pasanno (born 1949)
- Ajahn Sucitto (born 1949)
- Ajahn Sumedho (born 1934)
- Ajahn Sundara (born 1946)
- Ajahn Tong Sirimangalo (1923–2019)
- Ajahn Viradhammo (born 1947)
- Ampitiye Rahula Maha Thero (1913–2020)
- Anagarika Munindra (1915–2003)
- Aniruddha Mahathera (1915–2003)
- Ashin Dhammasāmi (born 1964)
- Ashin Jinarakkhita (1923 – 2002)
- Ashin Sandadika (born 1968)
- Ashin Thittila (1896–1997)
- Ashin Yazeinda (born 1969)
- Ayya Khema (1923–1997)
- Ayya Sudhamma Bhikkhuni (born 1963)
- Balangoda Ananda Maitreya Thero (1896–1998)
- Bhante Sujato (born 1966)
- Bhikkhu Anālayo (born 1962)
- Bhikkhu Bodhi (born 1944)
- Bhikkhu Kiribathgoda Gnanananda (born 1961)
- Bishuddhananda Mahathera (1909–1994)
- Bour Kry (born 1945)
- Buddhaghosa Mahasthavir (1921–2011)
- Chandra Khonnokyoong (1909–2000)
- Charles Henry Allan Bennett (1872–1923)
- Dhammalok Mahasthavir (1890–1966)
- Dipa Ma (1911–1989)
- Gangodawila Soma Thero (1948–2003)
- Godwin Samararatne (1932–2000)
- Gregory Paul Kramer (born 1952)
- Gyanashree Mahathero (1925–2025)
- Hammalawa Saddhatissa (1914–1990)
- Henepola Gunaratana (born 1927)
- Jack Kornfield (born 1945)
- John Earl Coleman (1930–2012)
- Joseph Goldstein (born 1944)
- Jyotipal Mahathero (1914–2002)
- Kadawedduwe Jinavamsa Mahathera (1907–2003)
- K. L. Dhammajoti (born 1949)
- K. Sri Dhammananda (1919–2006)
- Kirinde Sri Dhammaratana (born 1948)
- Kotugoda Dhammawasa Mahanayaka Thero (1933–2021)
- Kumar Kashyap Mahasthavir (1926–2012)
- Lance Selwyn Cousins (1942 – 2015)
- Larry Rosenberg (born 1932)
- Lokanātha (1897–1966)
- Luang Por Dattajivo (born 1940)
- Luang Por Dhammajayo (born 1944)
- Luangpor Thong (born 1939)
- Madihe Pannaseeha Thero (1913–2003)
- Mahasi Sayadaw (1904–1982)
- Matara Sri Nanarama Mahathera (1901–1992)
- Ñāṇamoli Bhikkhu (1905–1960)
- Nyānadassana Mahāthera (born 1959)
- Nyānaponika Mahāthera (1901–1994)
- Nyānatiloka Mahāthera (1878–1957)
- Ñāṇavīra Thera (1920–1965)
- Narada Maha Thera (1898–1983)
- Nauyane Ariyadhamma Mahathera (1939 –2016)
- Phra Paisal Visalo (born 1957)
- Piyadassi Maha Thera (1914–1998)
- Polwatte Buddhadatta Thera (1887–1962)
- Pragyananda Mahasthavir (1900–1993)
- Prajnananda Mahathera (born 1952)
- Preah Maha Ghosananda (1913–2007)
- Rajguru Aggavamsa Mahathera (1913–2008)
- Rupert Gethin (born 1957)
- Ruth Denison (1922–2015)
- Satya Priya Mahathero (1930–2019)
- Sayadaw U Paṇḍita (1921–2016)
- Sayadaw U Rewata Dhamma (1929–2004)
- Sayadaw U Sīlānanda (1927–2005)
- Sayadaw U Tejaniya (born 1962)
- S. N. Goenka (1924–2013)
- Sharon Salzberg (born 1952)
- Soma Thera (1898 - 1960)
- Tathālokā Bhikkhunī (born 1968)
- Thanissaro Bhikkhu (born 1949)
- U Dhammaloka (1856–1914)
- Pannya Jota Mahathera (1955–2020)
- Walpola Rahula Thero (1907–1997)
- Acharavadee Wongsakon (born 1965)

=== Tibetan Buddhist teachers ===
- Anagarika Govinda (1898–1985)
- B. Alan Wallace (born 1950)
- Chagdud Tulku Rinpoche (1930–2002)
- Chögyam Trungpa Rinpoche (1940–1987)
- Chökyi Nyima Rinpoche (born 1951)
- Damba Ayusheev, the XXIV Pandito Khambo Lama in Russia (born 1962)
- Dhardo Rimpoche (1917–1990)
- Dilgo Khyentse (1910–1991)
- Dudjom Jigdral Yeshe Dorje (1904–1987)
- Dzongsar Jamyang Khyentse (1961-)
- Dzongsar Khyentse Chökyi Lodrö (1893–1959)
- Gyaincain Norbu, the 11th Panchen Lama (controversial; born 1990)
- Kalu Rinpoche (1905–1989)
- Karma Thinley Rinpoche (born 1931)
- Kelsang Gyatso (born 1931)
- Matthieu Ricard (born 1946)
- Ole Nydahl (born 1941)
- Rangjung Rigpe Dorje, 16th Karmapa (1924–1981)
- Sakyong Mipham (born 1962)
- 14th Dalai Lama (born 1935)
- Tenzin Palmo (born 1943)
- Thubten Yeshe (known as Lama Yeshe; 1935–1984), Tibetan lama who, while exiled in Nepal, co-founded Kopan Monastery (1969) and the Foundation for the Preservation of the Mahayana Tradition (1975). He followed the Gelug tradition.
- Thubten Zopa Rinpoche
- Trijang Lobsang Yeshe Tenzin Gyatso (1901–1981)
- Tsoknyi Rinpoche (born 1966)
- Tulku Urgyen Rinpoche (1920–1996), Dzogchen, Mahamudra and the Chokling Tersar
- Yongey Mingyur Rinpoche (born 1975)
- Gelek Rimpoche (born 1939)
- Tsem Tulku Rinpoche (born 1965)
- Dagyab Kyabgoen Rinpoche (born 1940)
- Lama Doboom Tulku Rinpoche (17 February 1942 – 19 January 2024)
- Yongey Mingyur Rinpoche (born 1975)
- Sakya Trizin
- Thubten Chodron (born 1950)
- Pema Chödrön (born 1936)
- Robina Courtin (born 1944)
- Robert Thurman (1941–2026)
- Mark Epstein (born 1953)

=== Dzogchen and Bon teachers ===
- Namkhai Norbu (1938–2018)
- Tenzin Wangyal Rinpoche (born 1961)

=== Zen teachers ===
American

- Adyashanti (born 1962)
- Robert Baker Aitken (1917–2010)
- Anne Hopkins Aitken (1911–1994)
- Reb Anderson (born 1943)
- Zentatsu Richard Baker (born 1936)
- Joko Beck (1917–2011)
- Sherry Chayat (born 1943)
- Issan Dorsey (1933–1990)
- Zoketsu Norman Fischer (born 1946)
- James Ishmael Ford (born 1948)
- Tetsugen Bernard Glassman (1939–2018)
- Paul Haller
- Cheri Huber (born 1944)
- Soenghyang (Barbara Rhodes, born 1948)
- Philip Kapleau (1912–2004)
- Houn Jiyu-Kennett (1924–1996)
- Bodhin Kjolhede (born 1948)
- Jakusho Kwong (born 1935)
- Taigen Dan Leighton (born 1950)
- Frederick Lenz (1950–1998)
- John Daido Loori (1931–2009)
- Dai Bai Zan Cho Bo Zen Ji (born 1954)
- Heng Sure (born 1949)
- Bonnie Myotai Treace (born 1956)
- Brad Warner (born 1964)
- Robert J. Waldinger (born 1951)
- Jan Chozen Bays (born 1945)

Chinese

- Fayun (1933–2003)
- Hsu Yun (1840–1959)
- Hsuan Hua (1918–1995)
- Nan Huai-Chin (1918–2012)

European

Austrian

- Myokyo-ni (1921–2007)

British

- John Crook (1930–2011)
- Charles Tenshin Fletcher
- John Garrie (1923–1998)
- Paul Haller (born 1947)
- Hōun Jiyu-Kennett (1924–1996)
- Albert Low (1928–2016)
- Henry Shukman (born 1962)

Danish

- Choan Bertelsen Roshi

French

- Taïkan Jyoji (born 1941)

German

- Brigitte D'Ortschy (1921–1990)
- Hugo Enomiya-Lassalle (1898–1990)
- Willigis Jäger (1925–2000)
- Muhō Noelke (born 1968)

Italian

- Carlo Zendo Tetsugen Serra (born 1953)

Irish

- U Dhammaloka (1856–1914)

Polish

- Małgorzata Braunek (1947–2014)

Swedish

- Kanja Odland (born 1963)
- Sante Poromaa (born 1958)

Swiss

- Niklaus Brantschen (born 1937)
- Pia Gyger (1940–1914)

Indian

- Ama Samy (born 1936)

Japanese

- Shundo Aoyama (born 1933)
- Kōbun Chino Otogawa (1938–2002)
- Taisen Deshimaru (1914–1982)
- Hakuin Ekaku (1686–1769)
- Keido Fukushima (1933–2011)
- Jakushitsu Genkō (1290–1367)
- Shodo Harada (born 1940)
- Harada Daiun Sogaku (1871–1961)
- Dainin Katagiri (1928–1990)
- Musō Soseki (1275–1351)
- Imakita Kosen (1816–1892)
- Yamada Koun (1907–1989)
- Taizan Maezumi (1931–1995)
- Sōyū Matsuoka (?–1998)
- Sōkō Morinaga (1925–1995)
- Soen Nakagawa (1907–1984)
- Gudō Wafu Nishijima (1919–2014)
- Shōhaku Okumura (born 1948)
- Kōdō Sawaki (1880–1965)
- Nyogen Senzaki (1876–1958)
- Oda Sessō (1901–1966)
- Soyen Shaku (1859–1919)
- Zenkei Shibayama (1894–1974)
- Eido Tai Shimano (1932–2018)
- Omori Sogen (1904–1994)
- D. T. Suzuki (1870–1966)
- Shunryū Suzuki (1904–1971)
- Dai Bai Zan Cho Bo Zen Ji (born 1933)
- Bassui Tokushō (1327–1387)
- Sesshū Tōyō (1420–1506)
- Sobin Yamada
- Hakuun Yasutani (1885–1973)
- Bankei Yōtaku (1622–1693)
- Sesson Yūbai (1290–1348)

Korean

- Seongcheol (1912–1993)
- Seungsahn (1927–2004)
- Pomnyun (born 1953)

Malaysian

- Chi Chern (born 1955)

Singaporean

- Zhuan Dao (1871–1943)
- Hong Choon (1907–1990)

Taiwanese

- Guang Qin (廣欽) (1892–1986), founder of Cheng Tian Temple (承天禪寺) in Taiwan
- Yin Shun (印順) (1906–2005), founder of Humanistic Buddhism (人間佛教)
- Sheng-yen (聖嚴) (1931–2009), founder of Dharma Drum Mountain (法鼓山) in Taiwan
- Cheng Yen (證嚴) (born 1937), founder of Tzu Chi Foundation (慈濟基金會) in Taiwan
- Hsing Yun (星雲) (born 1927), founder of Fo Guang Shan (佛光山) in Taiwan
- Wei Chueh (惟覺) (born 1928), founder of Chung Tai Shan (中台禪寺) in Taiwan

Vietnamese

- Thích Nhất Hạnh (1926–2022)
- Thích Chân Không (born 1938)
- Thích Thiên-Ân (1926–1980)
- Thích Thanh Từ (born 1924)

== Writers ==
- Paula Arai, American professor and Buddhist studies scholar, specializing in the academic study of women and Buddhism
- Bhikkhu Analayo (born 1962), known for his comparative studies of early Buddhist texts as preserved by the various early Buddhist traditions
- Benimadhab Barua (1888–1948), Indian scholar of ancient Indian languages, Buddhism and law
- Buddhādasa Bhikkhu, his works take up an entire room in the National Library of Thailand, and inspired a group of Thai social activists and artists of the 20th century
- Ñāṇamoli Bhikkhu (1905–1960), remembered for his reliable translations from the Pali into English, remarkable command of the Pali language and a wide knowledge of the canonical scriptures
- Ṭhānissaro Bhikkhu (born 1949), known for his translations of almost 1000 Sutta in all and providing the majority of the sutta translations in a website known as "Access to Insight"
- Bhikkhu Bodhi (born 1944), second president of the Buddhist Publication Society and has edited and authored several publications grounded in the Theravada Buddhist tradition
- Tara Brach (born 1953), American psychologist and author
- Acharya Buddharakkhita (1922–2013), Indian Buddhist monk and prolific writer who established the Mahā Bodhī Society of Beṅgaḷūru, and had written 150 books and published two periodicals
- Shaila Catherine, American Buddhist meditation teacher and author in the Theravādin tradition
- Gotamī, Italian Buddhist nun and writer
- Tanaka Chigaku (1861–1939)
- John Crook (1930–2011), British ecologist, sociologist, and practitioner of both Ch'an and Tibetan Buddhism tradition
- Ven. K. Sri Dhammananda (1919–2006), Buddhist monk and scholar in Malaysia, wrote approximately 60 Buddhist works, ranging from small pamphlets to texts of over 700 pages
- Phra Dhammavisuddhikavi (born 1936), ex-Vice Rector for Academic Affairs at Mahamakut Buddhist University and has written 70 books on Buddhism
- Allen Ginsberg, poet (Tibetan Buddhism)
- Joseph Goldstein (born 1944), one of the first American Vipassana teachers, contemporary author of numerous popular books on Buddhism
- Nakamura Hajime (1911–1999)
- Charles Hallisey, Senior Lecturer on Buddhist Literatures at Harvard Divinity School
- Chittadhar Hridaya (1906–1982)
- Hsuan Hua (1918–1995), Tripitaka Master; extensive English commentaries on the major Mahayana Sutras: Avatamsaka Sutra, Shurangama Sutra, Shurangama Mantra, Lotus Sutra, Diamond Sutra, and many others
- Christmas Humphreys (1901–1983), British jurist who found London Buddhist Society, also wrote a number of works on Buddhism
- Daisaku Ikeda (1928–2023), former president of the Soka Gakkai International
- K. N. Jayatilleke (1920–1970), best known as the author of the book Early Buddhist Theory of Knowledge
- Y. Karunadasa (born 1934), Sri Lankan scholar in Buddhist Studies, whose areas of specialization are Early Buddhism and Theravada Abidhamma.
- Nishitani Keiji (1900–1990)
- Jack Kerouac, American novelist (Zen and Tibetan Buddhism; also the Catholic Church)
- Nishida Kitaro (1870–1945)
- Jack Kornfield (born 1945), American book writer, student of renowned forest monk Ajahn Chah, and teacher of Theravada Buddhism
- Noah Levine (born 1971), American Buddhist teacher and author
- Joanna Rogers Macy (born 1929), American poet and writer
- Sudarshan Mahasthavir (1938–2002), Nepalese Buddhist monk and author who played a major role in the development of Theravada Buddhism in Nepal and Nepal Bhasa literature
- Katukurunde Nyanananda Mahathera (1940–2018), best known for the research monograph Concept and Reality in Early Buddhist Thought
- Nyanatiloka Mahathera, (1878–1957), translated several important Theravadin Pali texts into German, also wrote a Pali grammar, an anthology, and a Buddhist dictionary
- S. Mahinda (1901–1951), Sikkimese Theravadin Buddhist monk and poet who has written over 40 books
- Tsunesaburo Makiguchi (1871–1944), Japanese educator and founder of the Soka Gakkai
- Edward Salim Michael (1921–2006), composer and author
- Achan Sobin S. Namto (born 1931), taught Vipassana meditation and Buddhist psychology in Southeast Asia and North America for over 50 years
- Karl Eugen Neumann (1865–1915), first translator of large parts of the Pali Canon of Buddhist scriptures from the original Pali into German
- Gudo Wafu Nishijima (1919–2014), compiled one of three complete English versions of Dōgen's ninety-five-fascicle Kana Shobogenzo and also translated Dogen's Shinji Shōbōgenzō
- Henry Steel Olcott (1832–1907), major revivalist of Buddhism in Sri Lanka and composed the notable "Buddhist Catechism" in 1881
- Kenneth Pai, Chinese-American writer
- P. A. Payutto (born 1937), lectured and written extensively about a variety of topics related to Buddhism, awarded the 1994 UNESCO Prize for Peace Education
- P. D. Premasiri (born 1941), Buddhist scholar specializing in the areas of Buddhist ethics and Buddhist philosophy
- Sharon Salzberg (born 1953), teacher of Buddhist meditation practices in the West, and also a New York Times best-selling author
- Sangharakshita (1925–2018), founder of the Triratna Buddhist community
- Sheng-yen (1930–2009), religious scholar, one of the most respected teachers of Chinese Ch'an (Zen) Buddhism, and founder of spiritual and educational organization Dharma Drum Mountain
- Yin Shun (1906–2005), brought forth the ideal of "Humanistic" (human-realm) Buddhism and regenerated the interests in the long-ignored Āgamas among Chinese Buddhists
- Sīlācāra (1871–1951), prolific writer and translator, translated Bhikkhu Ñāṇatiloka's The Word of the Buddha, from German into English
- Shunryū Suzuki (1904–1971), Sōtō Zen monk and teacher who helped popularize Zen Buddhism in the United States
- Weligama Sri Sumangala (1825–1905), outstanding scholar bhikkhu with many important publications
- Taixu (1890–1947), activist and thinker who advocated the reform and renewal of Chinese Buddhism
- Hikkaduwe Sri Sumangala Thera (1827–1911), did great service to improve the Buddhist education in Sri Lanka, also the founder of Vidyodaya Pirivena
- Migettuwatte Gunananda Thera (1823–1890), Sri Lankan Buddhist orator and one of the pioneers in Buddhist revival movement
- Nyanaponika Thera (1901–1994), co-founder of the Buddhist Publication Society, contemporary author of numerous seminal Theravada books
- Ratmalane Sri Dharmaloka Thera (1828–1885), founder of Vidyalankara Pirivena, which presently known as University of Kelaniya
- Palane Vajiragnana Thero (1878–1955), Buddhist monk and scholar, who the first broadcaster of Buddhist sermon over the radio in Sri Lanka
- Robert Thurman (born 1941), American author, editor and translator of books on Tibetan Buddhism, Je Tsongkhapa professor of Indo-Tibetan Buddhist Studies at Columbia University and co-founder and president of Tibet House U.S.
- Josei Toda (1900–1958), peace activist and second president of the Soka Gakkai
- Phra Paisal Visalo, writing and editing books on environment and Buddhism, co-founder of Sekiyadhamma, a network of socially engaged monks in Thailand
- Brad Warner (born 1964), American monk, writer, and musician
- Alan Watts (1915–1973), English writer and lecturer
- Frank Lee Woodward (1871–1952), English educationist and Pali scholar, compiling the vast concordance of Pāli Canon by translating eighteen of the forty-two volumes of the Pali texts into English
- Robert Wright (born 1957), American journalist and author. (Zen)
- Han Yong-un (1879–1944), Korean Buddhist reformer and poet

== Politicians and activists ==
=== Indian ===
- B. R. Ambedkar (1891–1956), Indian nationalist, jurist, scholar, political leader, anthropologist, economist and architect of the Constitution of India
- Phoolan Devi, Indian bandit and politicians.
- Mallikarjun Kharge, Indian lawyer and statesman serving as the President of the Indian National Congress since 2022 and Leader of the Opposition in Rajya Sabha since 2021.
- Priyanka Gandhi (Born 1972), Indian politician and the general secretary of the All India Congress Committee.
- Prakash (Balasaheb) Ambedkar (born 1954), Indian politician, Grandson of Dr. Babasaheb Ambedkar
- Ramdas Athawale (born 1959), Indian politician
- Udit Raj (born 1958), Indian politician and member of Indian National Congress. Raj, a Dalit, converted from Hinduism to Buddhism in 2001.
- Kiren Rijiju (born 1971), Indian politician and activists.
- Kanshi Ram, Indian politician and founder of Bahujan Samaj Party.
- Sonam Wangchuk (born 1966) Founder of Student's Educational and Cultural Movement Of Ladakh. And a Social Activist
- Chandrashekhar Azad Ravan (born 1987), Indian politician and the chief of Bhim army.
- Kumari Mayawati (born 1956), 18th Chief Minister of Uttarpradesh and Lawyer.

=== Malaysian ===
- Tan Cheng Lock (1883–1960), Malaysian nationalist, businessman and founder of Malaysian Chinese Association, key figure in the independence of Malaysia.

=== Japanese ===
- Morihiro Hosokawa, is a Japanese politician and noble who was Prime Minister of Japan from 1993 to 1994, leading a coalition government which was the first non-Liberal Democratic Party (LDP) government of Japan since 1955.

=== Nepalese ===
- Balen Shah, Nepalese politician, structural engineer, and rapper who is the prime minister of Nepal since 2026.

=== Burmese ===
- Aung San Suu Kyi (born 1945), Burmese opposition politician and chairperson of the National League for Democracy (NLD) in Burma; received the Rafto Prize and the Sakharov Prize in 1990 and the Nobel Peace Prize in 1991 (Theravada)
- U Nu (1997–1995), Prime Minister of Burma and facilitator of Sixth Buddhist Council
- U Thant (1909–1974), Burmese diplomat and third Secretary-General of the United Nations (1961–1971) (Theravada)
- Win Ko Ko Latt (born 1982), Burmese ultranationalist

=== American ===
- David Ige, American politician. He was the 8th governor of Hawaii. A Democrat, he served in the Hawaii State Senate from 2003 to 2014 and the Hawaii House of Representatives from 1985 to 2003. In the 2014 gubernatorial election, he defeated incumbent governor Neil Abercrombie in the Democratic primary, and won the general election over Republican nominee Duke Aiona. Ige was reelected in 2018.
- Colleen Hanabusa, U.S. Congresswoman (2011–2015, 2016–2019), Democrat and lawyer from Hawaii.
- Kazuhisa Abe (18 January 1914 – 18 May 1996) was a Democratic state senator and justice of the Supreme Court of Hawaii.
- Mazie Hirono, U.S. Senator (2013–), U.S. Congresswoman (2007–2013) and Democrat from Hawaii; first elected female senator from Hawaii, first Asian-American woman elected to the Senate, first U.S. senator born in Japan and the nation's first Buddhist senator.
- Hank Johnson, U.S. Congressman (2007–) and Democrat from Georgia; one of the first two Buddhists to serve in the United States Congress.
- Derek Tran, Democratic Congressman from CA-45 (2025–).
- Chi Ossé, American politician and activist from New York City who serves as a member of the New York City Council and son of Combat Jack.
- Irene Shin, American politician and former non-profit executive serving as a delegate of the Virginia House of Delegates since 2022.

=== English ===
- Eric Lubbock, 4th Baron Avebury (1928–2016), English politician; served as the Liberal Member of Parliament for Orpington and served in the House of Lords, having inherited the title of Baron Avebury in 1971. (Secular Buddhism)
- Suella Braverman is a British barrister and politician who has served as Home Secretary since 25 October 2022. She previously held the position from 6 September to 19 October 2022 under Liz Truss. A member of the Conservative Party, she was chair of the European Research Group from 2017 to 2018 and Attorney General for England and Wales from 2020 to 2022. She has been the member of Parliament (MP) for Fareham in Hampshire since 2015. She took her oath of office on the Dhammapada.

=== South Korean ===
- Jiyul (born 1957), Buddhist nun from South Korea who fasted to stop destruction of Korean salamander lands (Korean Seon)
- Pomnyun (born 1953), South Korean Buddhist monk, Zen master, and peace activist who received the Ramon Magsaysay Award for Peace and International Understanding in 2002 for his peace activism on the issue of Korean peninsula. (Korean Seon)

=== Vietnamese ===
- Thích Huyền Quang (1919–2008), Vietnamese Buddhist monk, dissident and activist; formerly the patriarch of the Unified Buddhist Sangha of Vietnam; in 2002, he was awarded the Homo Homini Award for his human rights activism by the Czech group People in Need
- Thích Quảng Độ, Vietnamese Buddhist monk, current patriarch of the Unified Buddhist Sangha of Vietnam; awarded the Homo Homini Award for human rights activism by the Czech group People in Need in 2002; nine-time Nobel Peace Prize nominee
- Thích Quảng Đức (1897–1963), Vietnamese Mahayana monk and self-martyr for freedom of religion; burned himself to death at a busy Saigon road intersection on 11 June 1963 (Mahayana)

=== Sri Lankan ===
- D. S. Senanayake (1883–1952), Prime Minister of Ceylon
- S. W. R. D. Bandaranaike (1899–1959), Prime Minister of Ceylon
- Sirimavo Bandaranaike (1916–2000), Prime Minister of Sri Lanka and first female Prime Minister in the world.
- Sir Cyril de Zoysa (1896–1978), President of the Senate of Ceylon from 1960 to 1965, also a leader in the Buddhist revival movement in Ceylon.

== Film and television ==
=== American ===
- Dan Harris (born 1971), American meditation teacher and retired journalist
- Jennifer Aniston (born 1965), American actress and producer (Zen)
- John Astin (born 1930), American actor
- Kate Bosworth, American actress (Soka Gakkai International) (Mahayana Buddhism)
- Jeff Bridges (born 1949), American actor; he has elaborated that his Buddhism is more like a general calmness. (Zen)
- Drew Carey (born 1958), American actor, comedian, game show host and photographer. (Theravada)
- Peter Coyote (born 1941), American actor and author
- Robert Downey Junior (born 1965), American Jewish Buddhist actor; he has said many times that Buddhism has helped him with his drug and alcohol addiction. (Theravada)
- Patrick Duffy (born 1949), American actor and director. The actor was brought closer to the teachings of Buddhism by his late wife, the ballet dancer Carlyn Rosser (1939–2017). He has been practicing the religion for almost 50 years as of 2022 and describes it as an "essential part" of his life. (Soka Gakkai International)
- Chris Evans (born 1981), American actor and a student of Indian Buddhism. He spent three weeks in Rishikesh in 2005 or 2006 at a Buddhist retreat and attends a Buddhism class in LA. (Theravada)
- Richard Gere (born 1949), American actor (Tibetan Buddhism)
- Ron Glass (1945–2016), American actor and comedian.
- Kate Hudson (born 1979), American actress and businesswoman. (Zen)
- Michael Imperioli (born 1966), American actor, writer, director and musician. In 2008, Imperioli became a Buddhist.
- Chris Kattan (born 1970), American actor, comedian and author. (Tibetan Buddhism)
- David Labrava (born 1962), actor, writer, tattoo artist, former member of the Hells Angels, and motorcycle enthusiast. (Zen)
- Celeste Lecesne (born 1954), American actor, author, screenwriter, LGBT rights activist, founder of The Trevor Project (Soka Gakkai International) (Nichiren Buddhism)
- Anthony Lee (1981–2000), American actor and playwright. (Soka Gakkai International)
- Mandy Patinkin (born 1952), American actor and singer known for his work in musical theatre, television and film.
- Elliot Page (born 1987), American-Canadian actor and activist. (Tibetan Buddhism)
- Jeremy Piven (born 1965), American actor, comedian and producer. (Zen)
- Steven Seagal (born 1952), American actor and aikido expert (Tibetan Buddhism)
- Garry Shandling (1949–2016), American actor and comedian. (Zen)
- Martin Starr (born 1983), American actor and comedian. (Theravada)
- Oliver Stone, American film director
- Sharon Stone, American actress, producer, and former fashion model
- George Takei (born 1937), American actor and author (Zen)
- Duncan Trusell (born 1974), American actor and stand-up comic (Tibetan Buddhism)
- Marcia Wallace, American actress, voice artist, comedian (Soka Gakkai International)

=== Argentine ===
- Jorge Sassi, Argentine model, actor and humorist.
- Diego Rafecas, Argentine model, actor and producer. He is well known for A Buddha (2005).
- Silvina Luna, Argentine model, actress.
- Santiago Ramundo, Argentine model, actor.

=== Brazilian ===
- Betty Faria, Brazilian actress.
- Dayenne Mesquita, Brazilian actress who played the lead role in two telenovelas.
- Edson Celulari (born 1958), Brazilian actor
- Carmo Dalla Vecchia (born 1971), Brazilian actor.
- João Vitti (born 1967), Brazilian theatre and telenovela actor.

=== British ===
- Adewale Akinnuoye-Agbaje (born 1967), British-Nigerian actor best known for his roles on television (Soka Gakkai International)
- Alex Day (born 8 April 1989) is an English musician, vlogger and writer. Day has released seven studio albums, two EPs, and had three UK Top 40 hits.
- Alex Ferns (born 13 October 1968) is a Scottish actor and television personality. His EastEnders role as Trevor Morgan was described as "Britain's most-hated soap villain", when he played the role between 2000 and 2002.
- David Yip, British actor and playwright.
- Tanya Moodie, British-Canadian actor and producer, best known for her work on the television series Motherland and Silo.
- Tom Baker (born 1934), British actor and writer.
- Orlando Bloom (born 1977), English actor known for his roles in film. (Soka Gakkai International)
- James Norton, English actor. (Tibetan Buddhism)
- John Garrie,(18 May 1923 – 22 September 1998), was a British actor who later became a respected teacher of Zen Buddhism.
- Benedict Cumberbatch (born 1976), British actor (Theravada).
- John Cleese (born 1939), British actor and comedian.
- Gigguk, British actor, YouTuber and podcaster who is known for his comedic rants and reviews on anime and otaku culture.
- Gordon Hopkirk (20 April 1884 – 1966) was a British actor of the silent era.
- Pamela Nomvete, British actress.
- Peter Dean (born 1939), British actor (Zen)
- Peter Finch, English–Australian actor of theatre, film and radio.
- Donovan, British singer, songwriter and record producer.
- Chris Gascoyne (born 1968), English actor (Theravada)
- Claudia Jessie, British actress (Soka Gakkai International)
- Barry Letts (1925–2009), English actor, television director, writer and producer
- Thandiwe Newton (born 1972), English actress. (Theravada)
- Naomi Watts, British-Australian actress and film producer
- Anulka Dziubinska, is an English actress and model. She was featured as Playboy magazine's Playmate of the Month in May 1973.
- Zhang Tielin (born 15 June 1957) is a British actor and film director. He is best known for portraying the Qianlong Emperor in the first two seasons of the Chinese television series My Fair Princess.
- Laura Howard (born as Laura Simmons in Chiswick, London, 1977) is an English actress.
- Rula Lenska (born 30 September 1947) is a British actress. She mainly appears in British stage and television productions and is known in the United States for a series of television advertisements in the 1970s and 1980s.
- Lauren Harries, English actress and television personality.

=== Danish ===
- Anne Louise Hassing, Danish actress (Soka Gakkai International)

=== Filipino ===
- Kylie Padilla, Filipino actress, singer, model and martial artist. Born as a Jehovah's Witness, she converted to Islam in her early childhood few years after her father Robin's conversion, despite not being devout growing up. She now identifies as a Buddhist as of 2025.

=== Hong Konger ===
- Chow Yun-fat (born 1955), famous Hong Kong actor
- Michael Lam (born 1966), former Hong Kong film actor and ordained as Buddhist monk in 2009, resident monk at Tsz Shan Monastery
- Andy Lau (born 1961), Hong Kong actor, singer-songwriter and film producer. He has been one of Hong Kong's most commercially successful film actors since the mid-1980s, performing in more than 160 films while maintaining a successful singing career at the same time.
- Tony Leung Chiu-wai (born 1962), Hong Kong actor and singer, one of Asia's most successful and internationally recognized actors.

=== Indian ===
- Danny Denzongpa is an Indian actor, singer, and film director who primarily works in Hindi and occasionally in Bengali, Nepali, and Tamil films.
- Kushal Badrike, actor, comedian
- Tisca Chopra, Indian actress (Soka Gakkai International)
- Bhalchandra Kadam (born 1970), actor, comedian
- Shraddha Das, Indian actress and model (Theravada)
- Ravi Dubey (born 1983), Indian Nichiren Buddhist actor, model and producer. He said, "I started following Buddhism when I was going through a very rough patch in my life and I wanted some understanding of the chaos that was going on in one's life. I wanted to align myself and feel better about myself. So, when things went out of control, I started chanting at that time." (Nichiren Buddhism)
- Manav Gohil (born 1974), Indian actor and producer. (Nichiren Buddhism).
- Tusshar Kapoor (born 1976), Indian Bollywood actor and producer. (Nichiren Buddhism)
- Ayushman Khurrana (born 1984), Indian film actor and activist. He and his wife Tahira Kashyap are followers of Nichiren Buddhism, which they state has helped them through a cancer diagnosis. (Niciren Buddhism)
- Gagan Malik (born 1976), Indian actor. (Theravada)
- Hansika Motwani, Indian actress. She has said in an interview, "The best way to effectively de-stress for me is to chant- Nam Myo Ho Renge Kyo, as I strongly follow Buddhism." (Tibetan Buddhism)
- Mandakini is an Indian former actress. She is best remembered for her lead role in the 1985 popular film Ram Teri Ganga Maili.
- Meiyang Chang (born 6 October 1982) is an Indian actor, television host, singer and a dentist.
- Abhijeet Sawant (born 1981), actor and singer

=== Italian ===
- Marco Columbro (born 1950), Italian actor and television host. (Tibetan Buddhism)
- Manuel De Peppe (born 1970), Italian actor, producer and singer, converted to Buddhism in 2011. (Secular Buddhism)

=== Macanese ===
- Isabella Leong (born 1988), Macanese actress and former singer.

=== Malaysian ===
- Michelle Yeoh (born 1962), Malaysian actress

=== Polish ===
- Andreas Wisniewski, German actor and former dancer
- Maja Ostaszewska, Polish actress and model.
- Małgorzata Braunek, Polish film and stage actress.

=== Singaporean ===
- Huang Wenyong (1952–2013), Singaporean actor and host
- Lin Meijiao (born 1963), Singaporean actress

=== Spanish ===
- Penélope Cruz, Spanish actress and model.
- Karla Sofía Gascón, Spanish actress and former model.

=== Taiwan ===
- Brigitte Lin (born 1954), Taiwanese actress, regarded as an icon of Chinese language cinema for her extensive and varied roles in both Taiwanese and Hong Kong films
- Takeshi Kaneshiro (born 1973), Japanese actor and singer based in Taiwan

=== Thai ===
- Napapa Tantrakul (born 1986), Thai actress

=== Venezuelan ===
- Eva Ekvall, Venezuelan fashion model and beauty pageant titleholder who was crowned Miss Venezuela 2000.

=== Vietnam ===
- Hồ Vĩnh Khoa (born 1988), Vietnamese actor and model.

== Billionaires ==
=== American ===
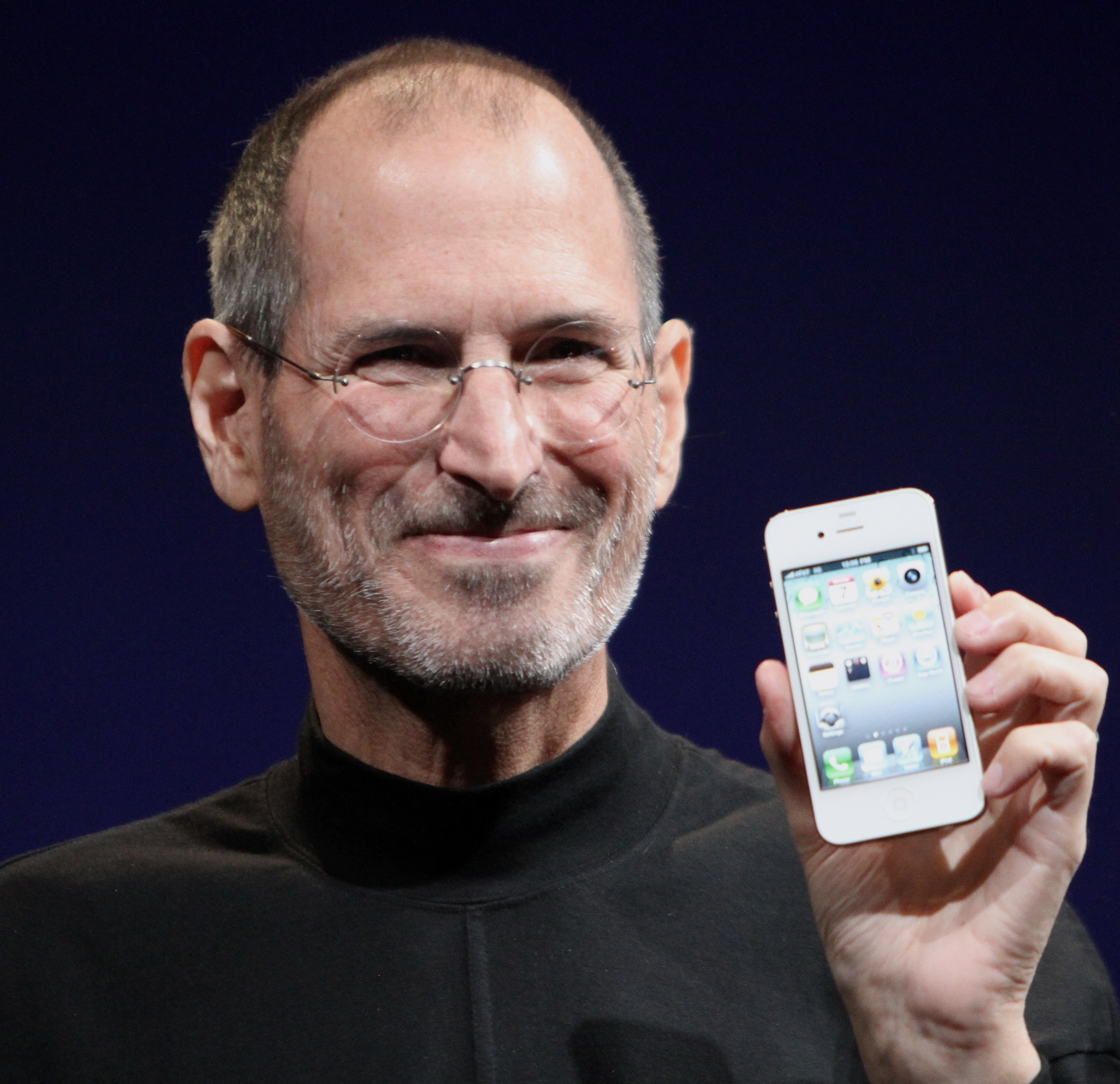
Steve Jobs

- George Dvorsky, Transhumanist, Futurist and a director of Humanity+ (Secular Buddhism)
- Jack Dorsey (1976– ), American technological entrepreneur and philanthropist who is the co-founder and former CEO of Twitter, as well as the founder and CEO of Block, Inc., a financial payments company. (Theravada)
- Linda Pritzker, American lama in the Tibetan Buddhist tradition. She is a spiritual teacher, author, philanthropist, and co-founder of the Namchak Foundation and Namchak Retreat Ranch.
- Nita Ing (born 17 March 1955, in Taipei) is the Taiwanese-American president of Continental Engineering Corporation and the former chairman of the board of the Taiwan High Speed Rail Corporation, the company which built a high-speed railway system from Taipei to Kaohsiung. A supporter of the Democratic Progressive Party, she had been an advisor to the former president Chen Shui-bian.

=== British ===
- Andy Puddicombe (born 23 September 1972) is a British author, public speaker and a teacher of meditation and mindfulness. He, alongside Richard Pierson, is the co-founder of Headspace, a digital health company that provides guided meditation training and mindfulness for its users.
- Clare Melford, British businesswoman and former CEO of Global Disinformation Index.

=== Czech ===
- Karel Janeček, Czech mathematician and billionaire.

=== Chinese ===
- Jack Ma, a Chinese business magnate, investor and philanthropist.
- Chen Feng, is a Chinese businessman and founder of business conglomerate HNA Group and Hainan Airlines.
- Wang Jianlin, is a Chinese business magnate, investor and philanthropist. He is the chairman, founder, and majority shareholder of the Dalian Wanda Group He previously owned 17% of the Spanish football club Atlético Madrid.

=== French ===
- Pierre Omidyar, French technology entrepreneur, software engineer, and the founder of eBay.

=== Hong Konger ===
- Li Ka-shing (born 1928) is a Hong Kong billionaire business magnate, investor, and philanthropist.

=== Japanese ===
- Yehan Numata (1897 – 1994), Japanese industrialist and Buddhist missionary, founder of Mitutoyo Corporation and Society for the Promotion of Buddhism.

=== Malaysian ===
- Robert Kuok, Malaysian business magnate, investor and philanthropist. According to Forbes, his net worth is estimated at $11.8 billion as of April 2023, making him the wealthiest Malaysian citizen and 96th wealthiest person in the world.

=== Sri Lankan ===
- Ernest de Silva, Ceylonese business magnate, banker, barrister and public figure, considered to be the most prominent Ceylonese philanthropist of the 20th century.

== Music ==
=== American ===
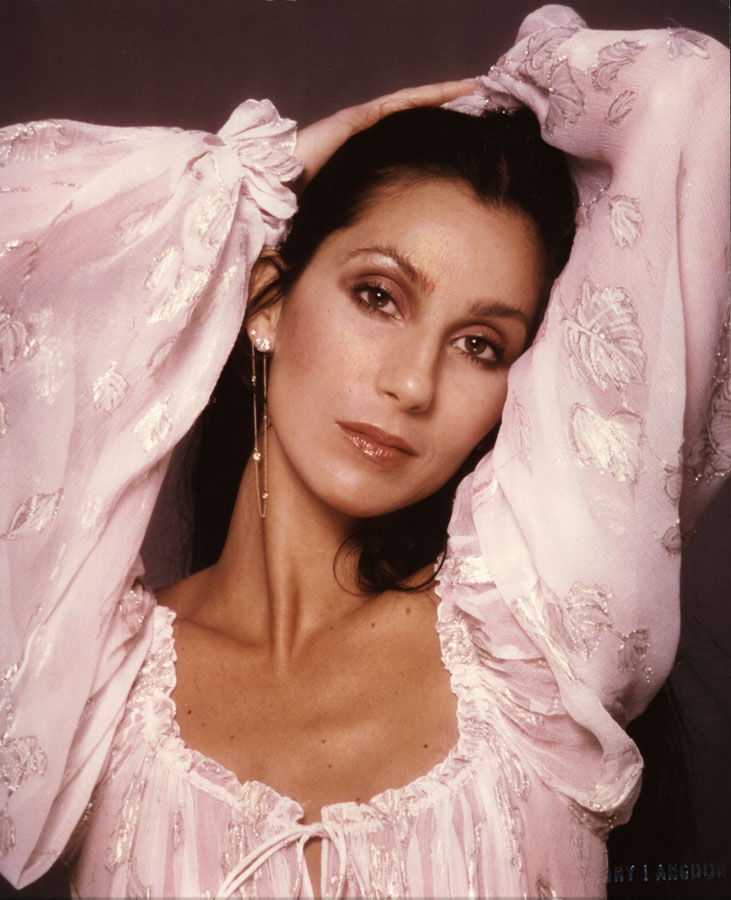
Cher, Goddess of Pop

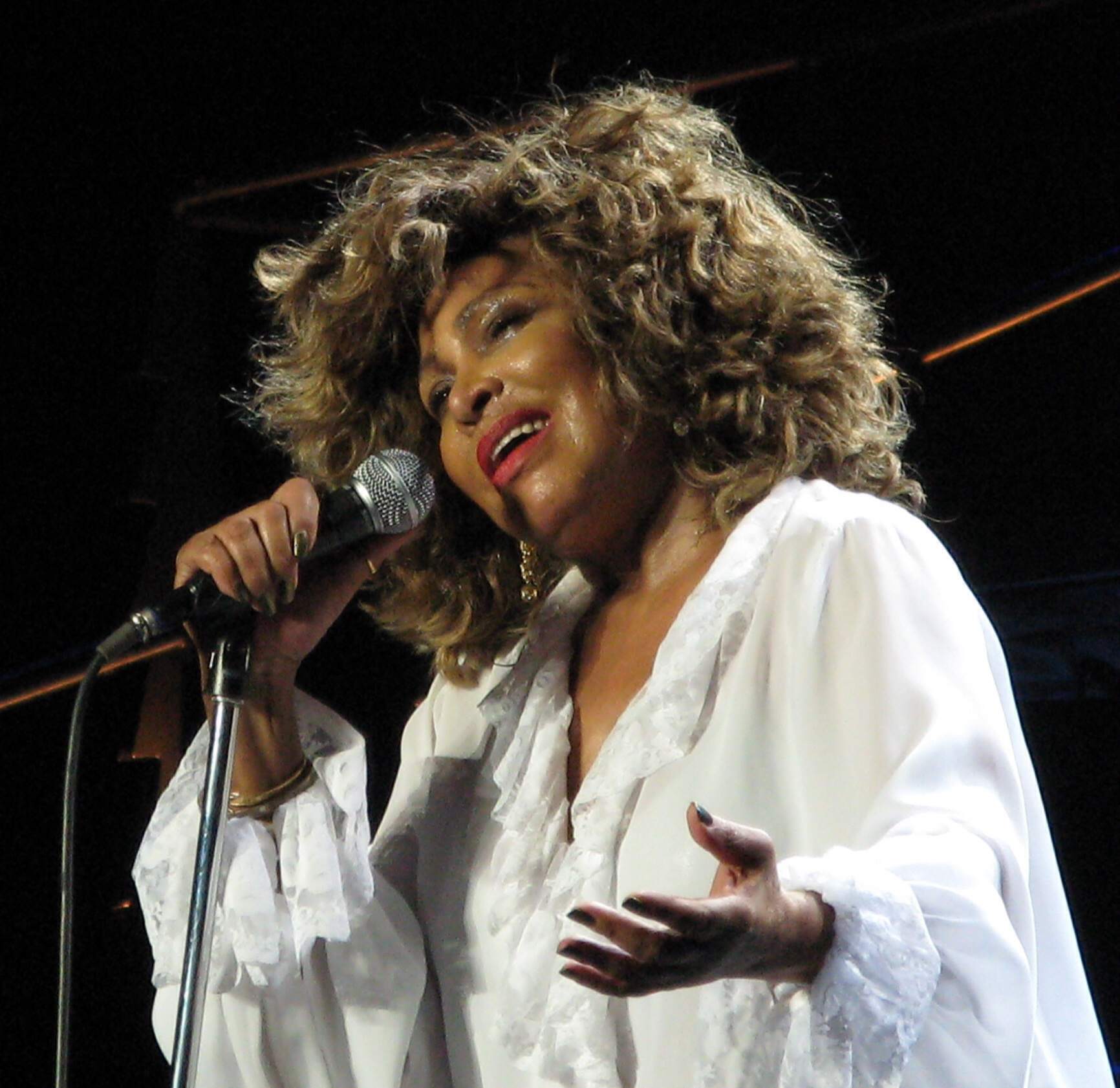
Tina Turner

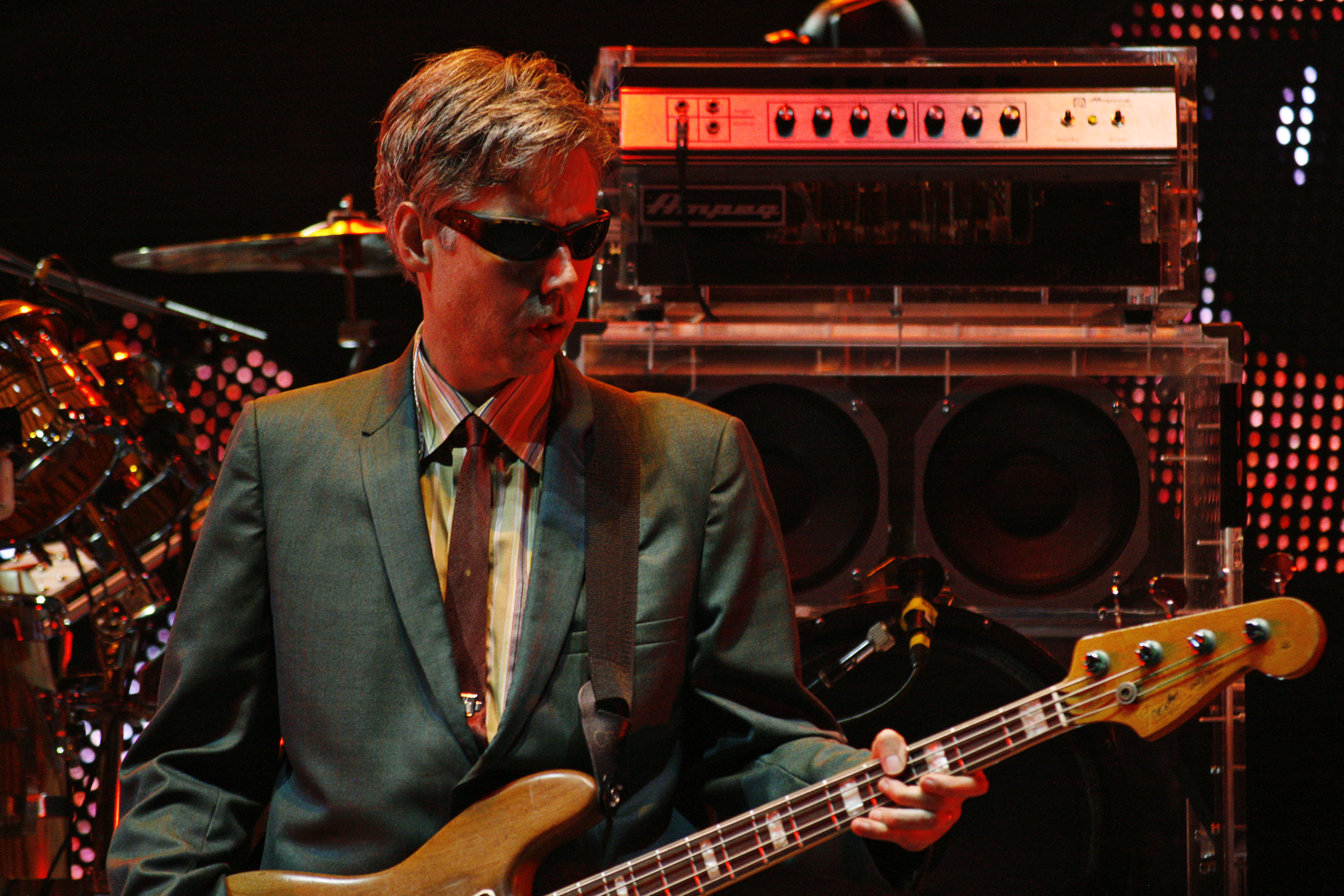
Adam Yauch

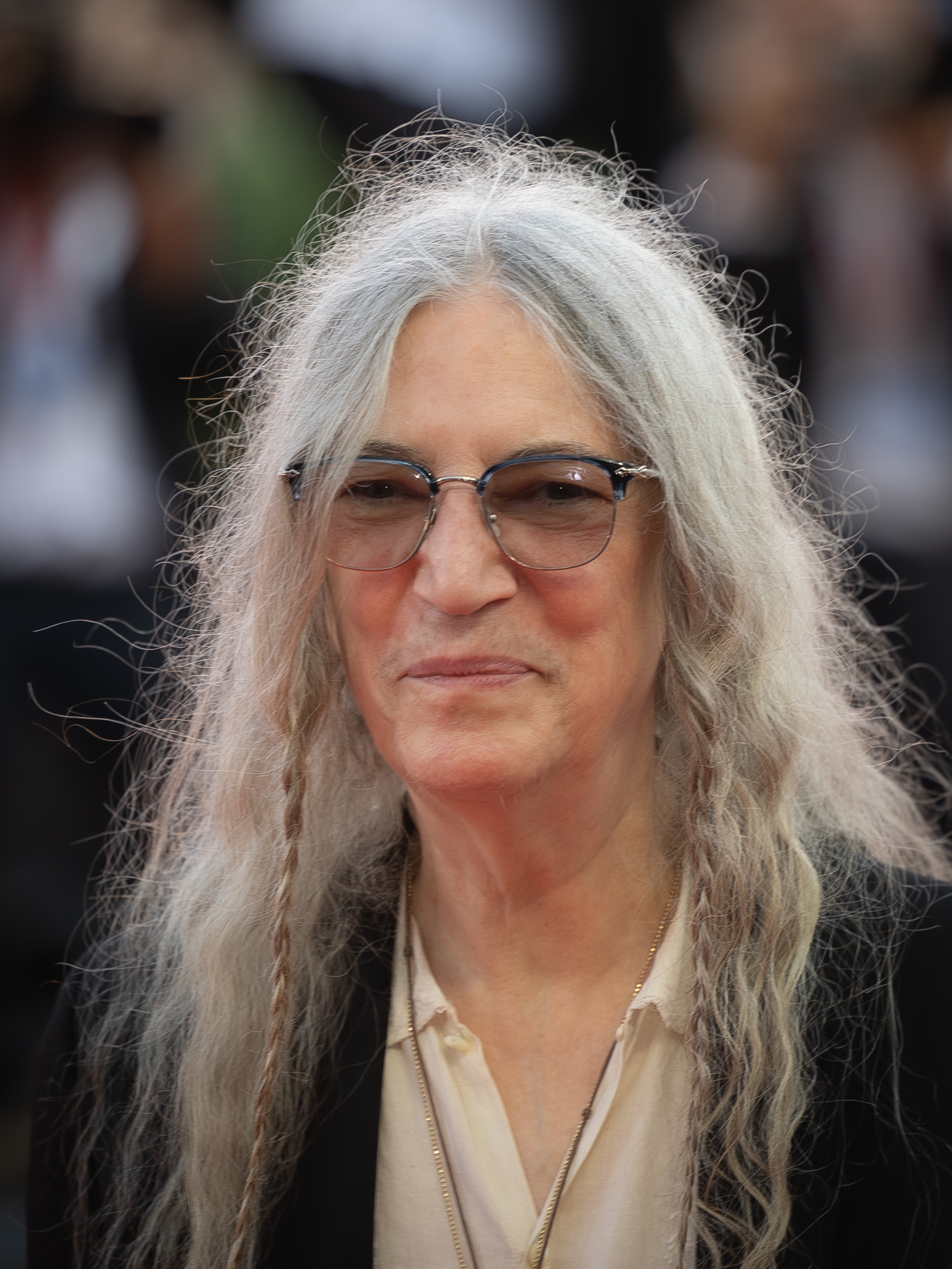
Patti Smith

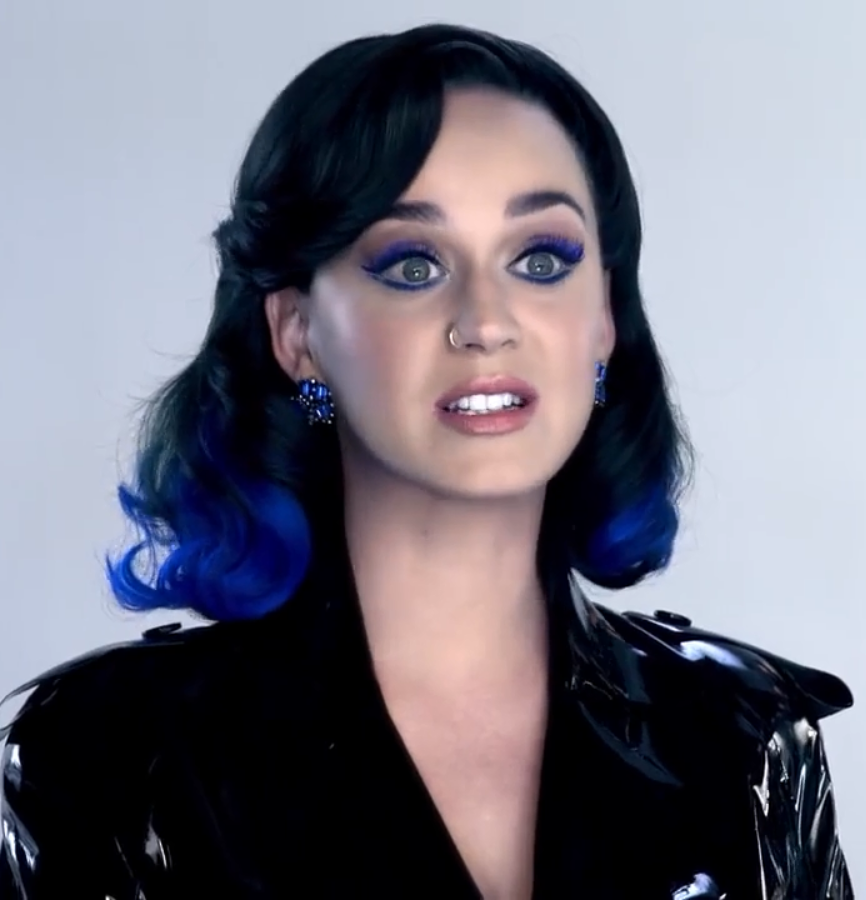
Katy Perry

- Adam Yauch, better known under the stage name MCA, was an American rapper, bass player, filmmaker and a founding member of the hip hop group Beastie Boys.
- Alanis Morissette (1974– ), Canadian-American singer, songwriter, and actress. Known for her emotive mezzo-soprano voice and confessional songwriting, Morissette began her career in Canada in the early 1990s with two mildly successful dance-pop albums.
- Aliana Lohan (22 December 1993– ), American singer, actress, fashion model and television personality. Ali Lohan converted to Buddhism after being raised in Catholicism.
- Arthur Russell, American cellist, composer, producer, singer, and musician.
- Anthony Newman (12 May 1941– ), American classical musician. While mostly known as an organist, Newman is also a harpsichordist (including the pedal harpsichord), pianist, composer, conductor, writer, and teacher.
- Bennie Maupin, American jazz multireedist who performs on various saxophones, flute, and bass clarinet.
- Belinda Carlisle, American singer
- Brad Warner (1964- ), American Sōtō Zen monk, author, blogger, documentarian and punk rock bass guitarist.
- Buster Williams – , American jazz bassist
- Cher, American singer and actress. She is known for her androgynous contralto voice, bold fashion and visual presentation, and multifaceted career. Her screen roles often reflect her public image as a strong-willed, outspoken woman. An influential figure in popular culture, Cher has sustained a career spanning more than six decades through continual reinvention.
- Chi Cheng (15 July 1970 – 13 April 2013), American musician and poet, best known as the bassist and backing vocalist for the American alternative metal band Deftones.
- Chynna Rogers, American rapper, disc jockey, and model who was signed by Ford Modeling Agency at the age of 14 and affiliated with the ASAP Mob.
- Coco Lee, Chinese-American singer and songwriter.
- Courtney Love, American singer-songwriter
- Duncan Sheik – , American singer-songwriter and composer
- Combat Jack (8 July 1964 – 20 December 2017), known professionally as Combat Jack, was a Haitian-American hip hop music attorney, executive, journalist, editor and podcaster.
- David Bennett Cohen (4 August 1942– ), American musician best known as the original keyboardist and one of the guitar players for the late-1960s psychedelic rock and blues band Country Joe and the Fish.
- Earl Sweatshirt, American rapper, songwriter, and record producer. (Nichiren Buddhism)
- Eric Erlandson (1963– ), American musician, guitarist, and writer, primarily known as founding member, songwriter and lead guitarist of alternative rock band Hole from 1989 to 2002. Erlandson has practiced Buddhism since 1992.
- Esperanza Spalding, American bassist, singer, songwriter, and composer. Her accolades include five Grammy Awards, a Boston Music Award, a Soul Train Music Award.
- Jesse Michaels (1969– ), American songwriter, vocalist, guitarist, artist, and author from Berkeley, California.
- John Cage, American singer and composer.
- Joseph Bowie (1953– ), American jazz trombonist and vocalist. The brother of trumpeter Lester Bowie, Joseph is known for leading the jazz-punk group Defunkt and for membership in the Ethnic Heritage Ensemble.
- Joseph Jarman (14 September 1937 – 9 January 2019) was an American jazz musician, composer, poet, and Shinshu Buddhist priest.
- June Millington (14 April 1948– ), Filipino American guitarist, songwriter, producer, educator, and actress.
- Katy Perry, American singer-songwriter, and television judge. She is known for her influence on the pop sound and style of the 2010s. Pursuing a career in gospel music at 16, Perry released her commercially successful debut album, Katy Hudson (2001), under Red Hill Records.
- Patti Smith, American singer, songwriter, poet, painter, author, and photographer.
- Paul Masvidal, American musician, best known as the guitarist, singer and a founding member of Cynic.
- Phạm Phi Nhung (10 April 1970 – 28 September 2021), Vietnamese-American singer, actress and humanitarian. She specialised in Dan Ca and Tru Tinh music. She sang for Paris By Night and Van Son and also acted in their plays and Tinh production. She also recorded music for Lang Van.
- Phoebe Snow, American roots music singer-songwriter and guitarist, known for her hit 1974 and 1975 songs "Poetry Man" and "Harpo's Blues", and her credited guest vocals backing Paul Simon on "Gone at Last".
- Peter Rowan (1942– ), American bluegrass musician and composer. Rowan plays guitar and mandolin, yodels and sings.
- Laurie Anderson (1947– ), American avant-garde artist, composer, musician, and film director whose work spans performance art, pop music, and multimedia projects. Initially trained in violin and sculpting. She became more widely known outside the art world when her single "O Superman" reached number two on the UK singles chart in 1981. She also starred in and directed the 1986 concert film Home of the Brave.
- Li Na, Chinese-American folk singer that gained particular popularity in the late 1980s and the 1990s China.
- Miguel Atwood-Ferguson, American singer, arranger, composer, music director, producer, DJ, orchestral conductor and educator.
- Nikolas Schreck, American singer-songwriter, musician, author, film-maker and Tantric Buddhist religious teacher based in Berlin, Germany.
- Roberta Donnay (10 August 1966, Washington, D.C.- ), American jazz singer. jazz vocalist, composer, and band leader produced by Orrin Keepnews. She is a practicing Buddhist.
- Rob Mounsey, American musician, composer, and arranger.
- Rick Rubin American record producer. He is a co-founder of Def Jam Recordings, founder of American Recordings, and former president of Columbia Records. He practiced Buddhism and meditation.
- Stacey Q, American pop singer-songwriter, dancer and actress. Her best-known single, John Mitchell's "Two of Hearts", released in 1986, reached number one in Canada, number three on the US Billboard Hot 100 and the top ten in five other countries.
- Steven Sater – , American playwright, lyricist and screenwriter best known for Spring Awakenings
- Suzanne Nadine Vega, American singer-songwriter best known for her folk-inspired music. Vega's music career spans almost 40 years.
- Tina Turner, American singer-songwriter and received 12 Grammy Awards, which include eight competitive awards, a Grammy Lifetime Achievement Award and three Grammy Hall of Fame inductions. Rolling Stone ranked her among the greatest artists and greatest singers of all time. She was the first black artist and first woman to be on the cover of Rolling Stone, the first female black artist to win an MTV Award.
- Wayne Shorter (25 August 1933 – 2 March 2023), American jazz saxophonist and composer.
- Zeena Schreck, American singer, visual and musical artist, author and the spiritual leader of the Sethian Liberation Movement (SLM).

=== Australian ===
- Jimmy Barnes (born 1956), Australian singer

=== British ===
- Amazonica is a British rock singer and DJ.
- Annabella Lwin (born 31 October 1966) is an Anglo-Burmese singer, songwriter and record producer best known as the lead vocalist of Bow Wow Wow.
- David Bowie (1947–2016), English singer-songwriter and actor.
- Boy George (born 1961), English singer, songwriter, DJ, fashion designer, mixed media artist, photographer and record producer (Soka Gakkai International)
- Maxi Jazz (born 1957), British rapper
- Gary Glitter, is an English former glam rock singer who achieved success in the 1970s and 1980s. During the 1980s Glitter became a Buddhist and a vegetarian.
- Limahl, is an English pop singer. He was the lead singer of the pop group Kajagoogoo beginning in 1981, before embarking on a brief solo career, garnering the 1984 hit "The NeverEnding Story", the theme song for the film of the same name.
- Howard Jones (born 1955), English musician, singer and songwriter
- Nick Jago is an English musician, best known as the former drummer and founding member of Black Rebel Motorcycle Club.
- Richard Batsford (born 25 October 1969) is an English pianist, composer and singer-songwriter. A further concert in 2010 at the Birmingham Buddhist Centre saw the same collaboration.
- Sandie Shaw (born Sandra Ann Goodrich; 26 February 1947) is a retired English pop singer. One of the most successful British female singers of the 1960s, she had three UK number one singles with "(There's) Always Something There to Remind Me" (1964), "Long Live Love" (1965) and "Puppet on a String" (1967).

=== Canadian ===
- Beverly Glenn-Copeland (born 1944), U.S.-born Canadian musician, songwriter and singer (Soka Gakkai International)
- Leonard Cohen, Canadian singer-songwriter/poet (Zen)
- k.d. lang (born 1961), Canadian singer (Tibetan Buddhism)

=== Chinese ===
- Faye Wong (born 1969), Chinese singer and actress (Tibetan Buddhism)
- Zhou Xun, Chinese actress and singer. Regarded as one of the Four Dan Actresses of China, Zhou became the first Chinese actor to achieve the "Grand Slam" in 2009.

=== Hong Kong ===
- Daniel Chan (born 1975), Hong Kong singer, songwriter, and actor. (Chan Buddhism)
- Jacky Cheung (born 1961), Hong Kong singer and actor
- Aaron Kwok (born 1965), Hong Kong singer and actor, also known as the "God of Dance"
- Anita Mui (1963–2003), Hong Kong singer and actress, considered one of the most iconic Cantopop singers
- Alan Tam (born 1950), Hong Kong singer and actor, who played major role in developing the Cantopop scene in the 1980s

=== Indian ===
- Vaishali Mhade (born 1984), singer
- Shibani Kashyap, Indian singer
- Abhijeet Kosambi, singer
- Surekha Punekar, Indian folk artist
- Adarsh Shinde (born 1988), singer, musician
- Vitthal Umap (1931–2010), singer

=== Italian ===
- Carmen Consoli, Italian singer and songwriter
- Catherine Spaak, Italian singer

=== South Korean ===
- Winter, South Korean K-pop idol, member of Aespa
- Max Changmin, South Korean singer-songwriter, actor, and a member of the pop duo TVXQ.
- Soyeon, South Korean rapper, singer-songwriter, and record producer, under Cube Entertainment.

=== Thai ===
- Lisa, Thai rapper, singer and member of the South Korean girl group Blackpink.

== Sport ==
=== Football ===
- Brett Kirk (born 1976), former Australian rules football player and current assistant coach.
- Fabien Barthez (1994–2006), French goalkeeper (Zen). He is the first Buddhist footballer in the world to win a Football World Cup and Euro.
- Josh Scobey (born 11 December 1979) is a former American football running back and kick returner who played seven seasons in the National Football League (NFL).
- Kwak Hee-Ju (born 5 October 1981) is a South Korean footballer who plays as a defender who last played for Suwon Samsung Bluewings.
- Dentinho, Brazilian professional footballer and Amazonas Futebol Clube.
- Kim Do-hoon, South Korean professional football manager and former player. He was most recently the manager of Singaporean club Lion City Sailors before his 11 August 2022 resignation.
- Kim Eun-jung ,(born 8 April 1979) is a South Korean retired footballer who played as a striker. He is currently a coach at Tubize after joining the team in 2015 as a youth scout.
- Park Ji-sung, South Korean former professional footballer who played as a midfielder. Park is the most successful Asian player in football history, having won 19 trophies in his career. He is the first Asian footballer to have won the UEFA Champions League, to play in a UEFA Champions League final, as well as the first Asian to have won the FIFA Club World Cup.
- Kevin Lidin, Swedish former footballer and Buddhist monk.
- Shunsuke Nakamura (born 1978), Japanese soccer player
- Sébastien Frey (born 1980), French former professional footballer who played as a goalkeeper. Frey has credited former Fiorentina legend Roberto Baggio as one of his spiritual mentors. (Soka Gakkai International)
- Roberto Baggio (1988–2004), Italian footballer (Soka Gakkai International)
- Mario Balotelli Barwuah (born 1990), Italian professional footballer. He is studying Buddhism in a bid to find inner peace and has bought several copies of the dharma, the religion's teachings, and set up a quiet area with a statue of Buddha where he can meditate. (Pure Land Buddhism)
- Mehmet Scholl (born 1970), German football manager and former player. (Theravada)
- Wang Dalei, is a Chinese professional footballer who currently plays for Chinese Super League club Shandong Taishan and the China national team.

=== Cricket ===
- Asanka Gurusinha (born 16 September 1966) is a Sri Lankan Australian former international cricketer who had an 11-year international career, playing 41 Tests and 147 One Day Internationals for Sri Lanka.
- Arjuna Ranatunga, Sri Lankan former cricketer and politician.
- Mahela Jayawardene (born 1977), Sri Lankan former cricketer and consultant coach.
- Kumar Sangakkara (born 1977), Sri Lankan cricket commentator, former professional cricketer, and businessman. (Theravada)
- Pravin Tambe, India cricketer.
- Lasith Malinga (born 1981), Sri Lankan professional cricket player and Captain of T20 International cricket of Sri Lanka. (Theravada)
- Sanath Jayasuriya (born 1969), Sri Lankan batter.
- Tillakaratne Dilshan (born 1976), Sri Lankan cricket player who converted from Islam to Buddhism at the age of 16, previously known as Tuwan Muhammad Dilshan. (Theravada)
- Tillakaratne Sampath (born 1982), Sri Lankan cricket player previously known as Tuwan Mohammad Nishan Sampath
- Sumon Barua is a first-class and List A cricketer from Bangladesh. A right-handed batsman and right arm medium fast bowler, he played for Chittagong Division in 2001/02.
- Suraj Randiv (born 1985), Sri Lankan cricket player. (Theravada)

=== Basketball ===
- Phil Jackson (born 1945), American former professional basketball player, coach, and executive.
- Grant Hill (born 1972), American former professional basketball player, coach, and executive.

=== Fencing ===
- Dorina Vaccaroni, Italian former fencer, competing in the foil. She received a gold medal in the foil team at the 1992 Summer Olympics in Barcelona and silver at the 1988 Summer Olympics in Seoul.

=== Swimming ===
- Anthony Ervin (born 1981), American gold medalist swimmer. (Zen)

=== Rugby ===
- Jonny Wilkinson (born 1979), English former rugby union player. (Thravada)
- Ricky Evans (born 1960), Welsh former international rugby union player.

=== Golf ===
- Tiger Woods, American golfer (Theravada)
- Grace Park (born 6 March 1979) is a retired South Korean professional golfer on the LPGA Tour. She was a member of the LPGA Tour from 2000 until her retirement in 2012 and won six LPGA Tour events, including one major championship, during her career.
- Bae Sang-moon (1986- ), is a South Korean professional golfer who plays on the PGA Tour.

=== Boxing ===
- Lucia Rijker, Dutch boxer
- Suro Krishna Chakma, Bangladeshi boxer and businessman.

=== Wrestlers ===
- Jinsei Shinzaki, is currently signed to the Michinoku Pro Wrestling promotion where he is the promotion's president. Shinzaki is also known for his appearances with other Japanese promotions such as All Japan Pro Wrestling (AJPW), New Japan Pro-Wrestling (NJPW), and Frontier Martial-Arts Wrestling (FMW). Shinzaki is perhaps most known for his stint in the United States-based World Wrestling Federation (WWF).
- Kim Hyeon-woo (born 6 November 1988, in Wonju, Gangwon-do) is a male wrestler from South Korea. In the 2012 Summer Olympics, Kim won the gold medal in the 66 kg Greco-Roman wrestling final.
- Matt Sydal, is an American professional wrestler currently signed to All Elite Wrestling (AEW).
- Peter Thornley (born 19 October 1941) is an English retired professional wrestler who was best known for the ring character Kendo Nagasaki.

=== Sumo wrestling ===
- Hakuhō Shō, sumo wrestler

=== Skier ===
- Eileen Gu, American freestyle skier and one of the highest-paid women's athletes worldwide.

== Military ==
=== American ===
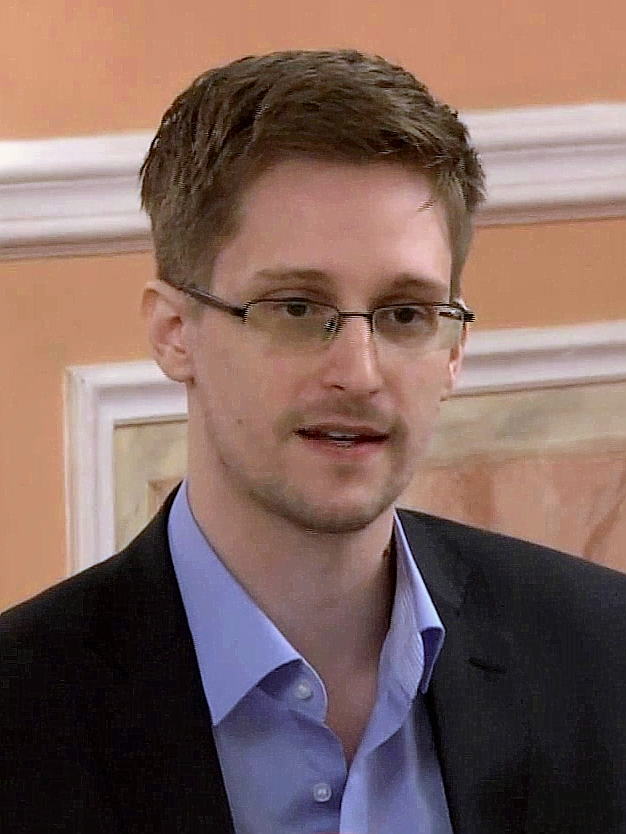
Edward Snowden

- Aidan Delgado, American attorney, author, and war veteran. His 2007 book The Sutras of Abu Ghraib detailed his experiences during his deployment in Iraq.
- Claude AnShin Thomas, American Buddhist monk and Vietnam Veterans Memorial.
- Richard Machowicz, American Navy SEAL officer and the host of the Discovery Channel and Military Channel show Future Weapons. He was the newest member on Spike's show Deadliest Warrior.
- George Lennon (25 May 1900 – 20 February 1991), American-Irish Republican Army leader during the Irish War of Independence and the Irish Civil War.
- Edward Snowden, American NSA agent and whistleblower.
- John David Provoo (August 6, 1917 – August 28, 2001), United States Army staff sergeant.
- Peter Matthiessen, American CIA agent, novelist, naturalist, wilderness writer and zen teacher.
- Lawrence Rockwood, American human rights and democratic socialist activist who is a former U.S. Army counterintelligence officer.
- Shiro Kashiwa (October 24, 1912 – March 13, 1998), first Attorney General of Hawaii to be appointed after it became a state in 1959.
- Ming Chang – rear admiral (upper half), U.S. Navy, retired. Department of Navy Inspector General, 1987–1990
- Dan Choi, first lieutenant, U.S. Army. Gay rights advocate.
- Viet Xuan Luong, Major General, US Army Japan
- Lapthe Flora, Major General, Combined Joint Task Force – Horn of Africa

=== British ===
- Arthur Lillie (24 February 1831 – 28 November 1911), was a Buddhist, soldier in the British Indian Army, and a writer.
- Neville Armstrong (20 October 1913 – September 2008) was a British soldier, literary agent, and publisher.

== Buddhist practitioners notable in other fields ==
- Francisco Varela, Chilean biologist, philosopher, cybernetician, and neuroscientist who is best known for introducing the concept of autopoiesis to biology.
- Anne Rudloe, American marine biologist. She was the co-founder of the Gulf Specimen Marine Laboratory in Panacea, Florida.
- Kirsan Ilyumzhinov, oligarch, administrator and politician. He was President of the Republic of Kalmykia in the Russian Federation from 1993 to 2010, and was president of FIDE, the chess international governing body, from 1995 to 2018.
- George Dvorsky, Transhumanist, Futurist and a director of Humanity+ (Secular Buddhism)
- Edward Snowden, American former NSA intelligence contractor and whistleblower
- Tenzing Norgay, first person to reach the summit of Mount Everest.
- Jet Li, Chinese martial artist, Hollywood actor (Tibetan Buddhist)
- Naima Mora, American fashion model and winner of America's Next Top Model (Soka Gakkai International)
- Maya Soetoro-Ng, Indonesian American writer, university instructor and maternal half-sister of Barack Obama, the 44th President of the United States
- Priscilla Chan, pediatrician and philanthropist, wife of Facebook founder Mark Zuckerberg

== Fictional Buddhists ==
=== Anime and manga ===
- Gautama Buddha, protagonist from Saint Young Men
- The cast from Ah My Buddha
- Ikkyū, protagonist from Ikkyū-san
- The cast from Oseam
- Seishin Muroi, character from Shiki
- Yoh Asakura, protagonist of the anime/manga Shaman King
- Hanamaru Kunikida, character from Love Live! Sunshine!!
- Miroku, character from Japanese Anime Inuyasha
- Krillin, character from the Dragonball series
- Kaname Asahina, Chiaki and Yūsei, characters from Brothers Conflict
- Chichiri, character from Fushigi Yūgi
- Yakumo Kokonoe, character from The Irregular at Magic High School
- Mayura Sōda, Miyuki Sagara, and Yukimasa Sagara, characters from RDG: Red Data Girl
- Keisei Tagami and Akasha Shishidō, characters from the Corpse Princess series
- Anji Yūkyūzan, character from Rurouni Kenshin
- Enkai, character from Requiem from the Darkness

=== Graphic novels ===
- Enigma, Marvel Comics superheroine
- Xorn, Marvel Comics character and member of the X-Men
- Green Lama, American pulp magazine hero
- Green Arrow (Connor Hawke), DC Comics superhero

=== Literature ===
- Sun Wukong, Monkey King in Chinese epic novel Journey to the West, and a fictional pupil of historical Chinese monk Xuanzang
- Mary Elizabeth, character from the novel The Perks of Being a Wallflower

=== Film and television ===
- Steve Jinks, character from Warehouse 13, (Season 3, Episode 1) "The New Guy"
- Daryl Dixon, character from The Walking Dead, Episode 8 (Season 2, Episode 2) "Bloodletting"
- Kahn Souphanousinphone, character from the cartoon King of the Hill
- Connie Souphanousinphone, character from the cartoon King of the Hill
- Dale Cooper, protagonist of the television series Twin Peaks
- Kyle Valenti, character from the television series Roswell
- Lisa Simpson, feminist and daughter of Homer and Marge Simpson, character from the cartoon The Simpsons Episode 275 (Season 13 Episode 6) "She of Little Faith"
  - Lenny and Carl and Carl Carlson, and Lenny Leonard
- Trini Kwan, original Yellow Ranger of the Mighty Morphin Power Rangers
- Wendy Wu, protagonist of the Disney Channel Original Movie Wendy Wu: Homecoming Warrior
- Master Splinter, Zen sensei/teacher to the Teenage Mutant Ninja Turtles
- Hiro Nakamura, protagonist character in TV series Heroes
- Gi, Planeteer able to wield the element water
- Edina Monsoon (Eddy) from the Absolutely Fabulous TV sitcom
- The God character in the South Park episode "Probably"
- Charlie Crews, Zen Buddhist, protagonist of television series Life
- Buddha, character from Air Buddies
- Satomi Ito, Alpha Werewolf and leader of Buddhist werewolf pack in the television series Teen Wolf (2011 TV series)

=== Video games ===
- Liu Kang, character from the video game and later movie, Mortal Kombat
- Sage, a class of trainer from the Pokémon series

=== Misc ===
- 2D, lead singer and keyboardist of the British virtual band Gorillaz
- Jeremy, from the popular web series Pure Pwnage

== See also ==
- Awgatha
- Three Refuges
- Five precepts
- Dalit Buddhist movement
- Jewish Buddhists
- List of American Buddhists
- List of British Buddhists
- List of Marathi Buddhists
- List of converts to Buddhism
- List of converts to Buddhism from Christianity
- Outline of Buddhism
