= Gyger =

Gyger is a surname. Notable people with the surname include:

- Hans Conrad Gyger, (1599-1674), Swiss cartographer
- Patrick Gyger (born 1971), Swiss historian and writer
- Pia Gyger (1940–2014), Swiss Zen master
- Rudolf Gyger (1920–1996), Swiss footballer
- Walter Gyger, Swiss diplomat
