= Dragon Ball (disambiguation) =

Dragon Ball is a Japanese media franchise created by Akira Toriyama in 1984.

Dragon Ball may refer to:

- Dragon Ball (manga) (1984), original manga series by Toriyama and first release in the Dragon Ball franchise
- Dragon Ball (TV series) (1986), first television series adaptation of the manga series
- Dragon Ball: Curse of the Blood Rubies (1986), first film adaptation

== Media relating to Dragon Ball ==
- List of all Dragon Ball television series
- List of all Dragon Ball films
- List of all Dragon Ball video games
- List of all Dragon Ball soundtracks

== Other usage ==
- DragonBall (microcontroller), a low-power microcontroller processor design

== See also ==
- Bel and the Dragon, a deuterocanonical biblical tale incorporated as chapter 14 of the extended Book of Daniel
- Dragon's Egg, a science fiction novel by Robert L. Forward
- Dragon's egg, a type of firework pyrotechnic star
- Dragonseeds, a video game where the player breeds and trains dragons
- Dragonsphere, a point-and-click graphic adventure game
- Tide jewels, gemstone that the dragon holds and uses in Japanese mythology
