= Phra Paisal Visalo =

Paisal Visalo (Thai: ไพศาล วิสาโล; born May 10, 1957), is a Thai Buddhist monk, author and the abbot of Wat Pasukato in Chaiyaphum province of Thailand. He was involved in student activism and human rights protection before entering the monkhood in 1983. He is the co-founder of Sekiyadhamma, a network of socially engaged monks all over the country. Besides writing and editing books on environment and Buddhism, he holds training courses on nonviolence and meditation as well. He was recently the recipient of the Asian Public Intellectual Fellowship of the Nippon Foundation.
