= Win Ko Ko Latt =

Burmese activist, advisor, politician, and writer

- ဝင်းကိုကိုလတ်
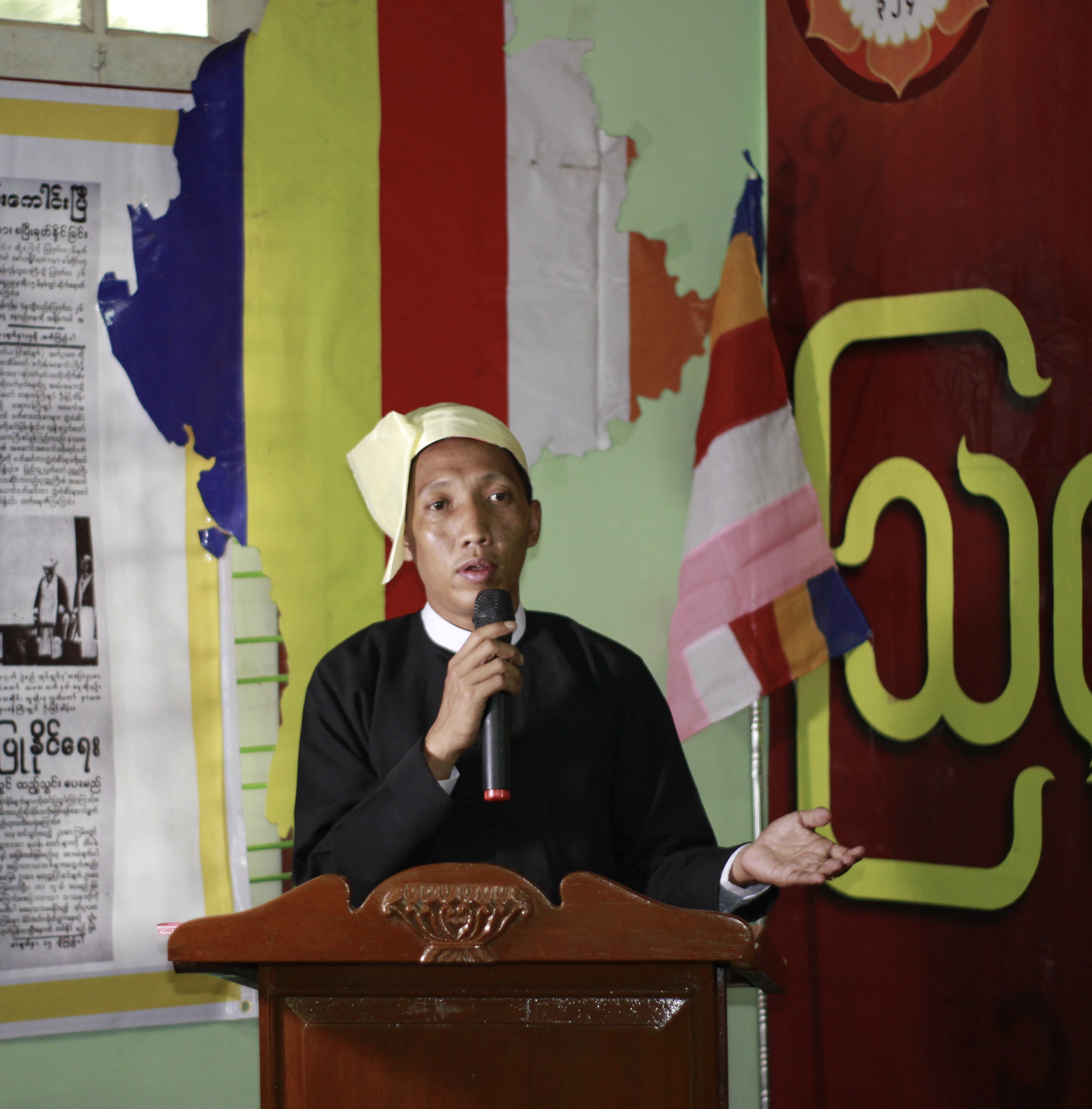
- Born: June 16, 1982 (age 44); Htantabin, Myanmar
- Education: Bachelor of Laws (LL.B)
- Alma mater: University of Distance Education, Yangon
- Occupations: Political Activist, Lawyer
- Known for: Nationalism

Win Ko Ko Latt (Burmese: ဝင်းကိုကိုလတ်; born 16 June 1982), also known as Thakin Gyi (Burmese: သခင်ကြီး) and Thakin Latt (Burmese: သခင်လတ်), is a Burmese ultranationalist, Buddhist nationalist, advisor, and writer. He is the former chairman of the Myanmar National Network, a faction of the Ma Ba Tha.

== Early life and education ==
Win Ko Ko Latt was born on 16 June 1982 in Htantabin Township, Yangon Region, Myanmar. He graduated with a law degree from the University of Distance Education, Yangon.

== Career and movement ==
Win Ko Ko Latt is an ultra-nationalist, leading many nationalist protests in Myanmar. He has served as the chairman of Myanmar National Network, an organization which is closely related to the Committee for the Protection of nationality and religion.

On July 10, 2017, Win Ko Ko Latt led monks and nationalist activists in a protest against in front of the United States Embassy against a statement made by the embassy; the protestors insisted there were no Rohingya in Myanmar. Win Ko Ko Latt, four other nationalist leaders (Thet Myo Oo, Nay Win Aung, and Naing Win Tun), and three monks (U Par Mauk Kha, U Nyarna Dhamma, and U Thu Seikta) were arrested for staging a protest against the terminology of "Rohingya community" at the US embassy. The group used the phrase "Muslim community in Rakhine State" to refer to self-identifying Rohingya in the region. All were prosecuted by Police Captain Thein Han at Kamayut Court on 17 August 2017. Win Ko Ko Latt and the four other nationalists were sentenced to six months in Insein Prison by the Bahan Township Court, but no mention was made of the three monks.

In the 2015 election, he contested for the House of Representatives seat from the Pantanaw township constituency, Ayeyarwady Region, but lost to Mahn Nyunt Thein, a National League for Democracy candidate.
