= Kevin Lidin =

Swedish former footballer and Buddhist monk

- Born: Kevin Lidin; March 4, 1999 (age 27); Lund, Sweden
- Occupations: Former professional footballer; Buddhist monk
Kevin Lidin
Personal life
- Known for: Transition from professional football to monastic life
Religious life
- Religion: Buddhism
- Denomination: Theravada
- Ordination: 2021
Senior posting
- Based in: Thailand
- Previous post: Professional footballer
Kevin Lidin
Personal information
- Position: Midfielder
Youth career
- Lunds BK
Senior career*
| Years | Team | Apps | (Gls) |
| 2016–2018 | Lunds BK | 5 | (2) |
| 2018–2020 | Pisa | 20 | (1) |
| 2018–2019 | → Paganese (loan) | 11 | (4) |
| 2021 | Limhamn Bunkeflo | 6 | (8) |
| Total | | 42 | (15) |
- * Club domestic league appearances and goals

Kevin Lidin (born 4 March 1999) is a Swedish former professional footballer and Buddhist monk. He played as a midfielder in Sweden and Italy before retiring in his early twenties. After ending his football career, he travelled to Thailand where he undertook a period of Buddhist monastic training.

== Early life ==
Lidin was born in Lund, Sweden. He developed within the youth academy of Lunds BK and progressed through the club's youth structure. Swedish reporting later described him as a technically oriented midfielder who sought opportunities abroad as a teenager.

== Professional career ==
=== Lunds BK ===
Lidin made recorded league appearance for Lunds BK in Ettan Fotboll, the third tier of Swedish football.

=== Move to Italy ===
At 18 years old, Lidin moved to Italy to pursue a professional career. He joined Pisa during the club's participation in Serie C. During his time at Pisa, the team secured promotion from Serie C.

Although he trained with the first-team environment, no senior competitive league appearances are officially recorded for him at Pisa.

=== Loan to Paganese ===
During the 2018–19 season, Lidin was loaned to Paganese in Serie C, where he made one recorded league appearance.

=== Return to Pisa and Sweden ===
He returned to Pisa in early 2020. In 2021 he joined Swedish side Limhamn Bunkeflo.

== Injuries and retirement ==
Recurring injuries significantly affected Lidin's professional development. Swedish sources report that he underwent six operations during his playing career. The repeated rehabilitation periods limited his match availability and progression within competitive squads.

He retired from professional football at age 23.

== Monastic life ==
Following his retirement, Lidin travelled to Thailand where he initially engaged in yoga and meditation as part of physical and mental recovery. He later entered a structured 30-day Buddhist monk programme.

During this period he shaved his head, wore monastic robes and adhered to a disciplined daily schedule, including meditation, alms practices and communal temple routines associated with Theravada Buddhism.

== Later life ==
After his time in Thailand, Lidin resided for a period in Barcelona, where he pursued studies in psychology and personal training through remote education. He continued practising meditation and physical training, describing his shift away from competitive sport toward personal development and mental balance.

== Career statistics ==
| Club | Season | League | Apps | Goals |
|---|---|---|---|---|
| Lunds BK | 2016–17 | Ettan Fotboll | 5 | 2 |
| Pisa | 2018–20 | Serie C | 20 | 1 |
| → Paganese (loan) | 2018–19 | Serie C | 11 | 4 |
| Limhamn Bunkeflo | 2021 | Swedish lower divisions | 6 | 8 |
| Total | | | 42 | 15 |

== See also ==
- List of Swedish footballers
- Buddhism in Thailand
