= Yazeinda =

Burmese Theravada Buddhist monk and writer

Ashin Yazeinda
- အရှင်ရာဇိန္ဒ
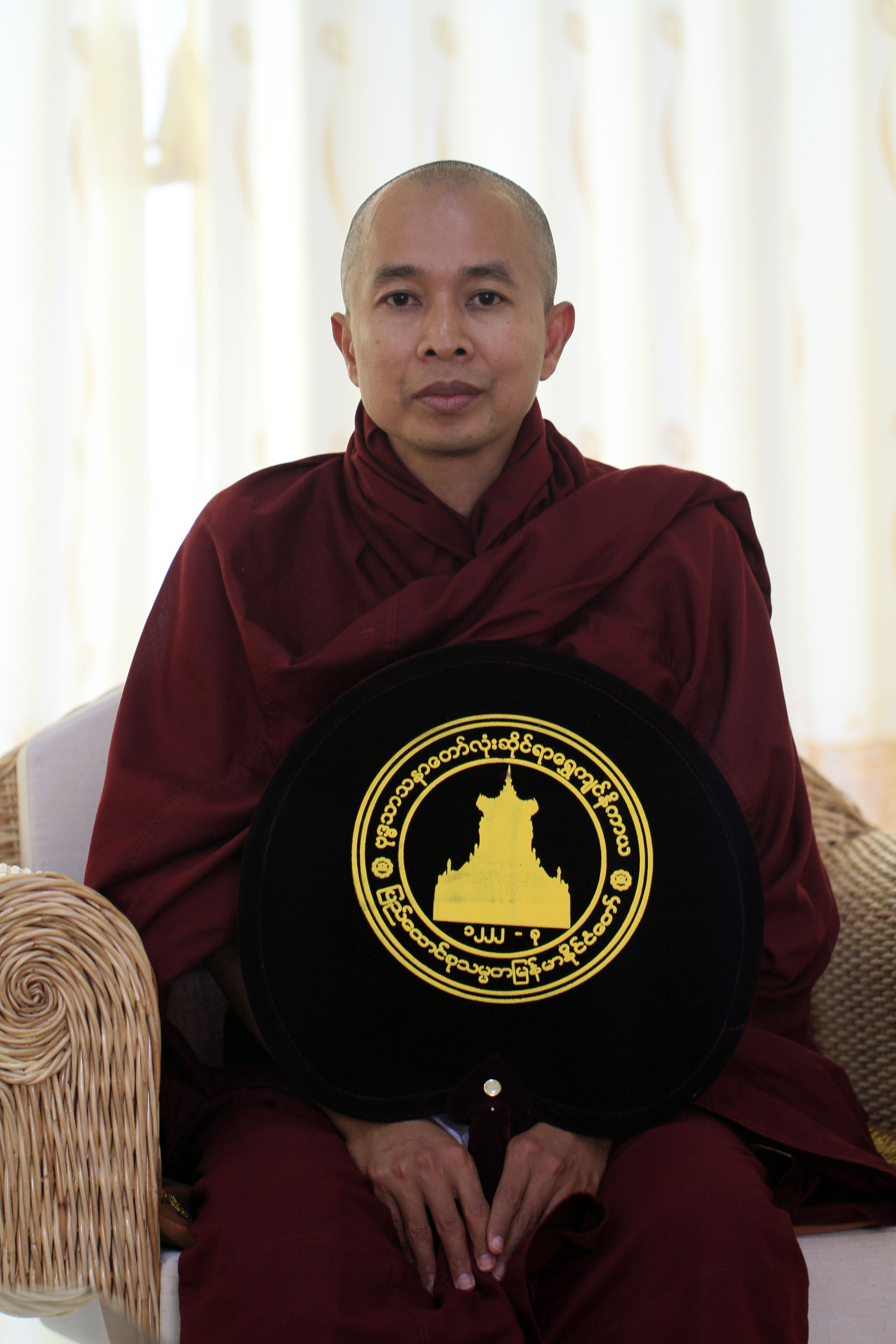
- Yazeinda in 2012
- Title: Sayadaw

Personal life
- Born: 18 June 1969 (age 56) Inma, Thegon Township, Pegu Division, Burma
- Other name: Yawai Nwe
- Occupation: Buddhist monk

Religious life
- Religion: Buddhism
- Temple: Dhammayawei Monastery
- School: Theravada
- Monastic name: Rājinda ရာဇိန္ဒ
- Website: www.yawainwe.net

Ashin Yazeinda (Burmese: အရှင်ရာဇိန္ဒ, Pali: Rājinda), better known by his pen name Yawai Nwe (ရဝေနွယ်), is a prominent Burmese Theravada Buddhist monk and writer.

Ashin Yazeinda was born on 18 June 1969 in the town of Inma, Thegon Township, Pegu Division to parents U Thein Ni Sein and Daw Kyin Nu. He ordained as a novice (Pali: samanera) in 1979, and again in 1980. He began penning stories for the Flower magazine in 1985.

In 1989, he was fully ordained as a bhikkhu, and studied at Rangoon's Mahavisuddhāruṃ Pali University and Monastery (မဟာဝိသုဒ္ဓါရုံ ပါဠိတက္ကသိုလ် ကျောင်းတိုက်). The following year, he began publishing Dhamma articles in the Myat Mingala journal.

In 2000, the Burmese government conferred him the title of Sāsanadhaja Dhammācariya (သာသနဓဇ ဓမ္မာစရိယဘွဲ့). In January 2003, he published a seminal religious work, Would You Like to Meet Every Existence? (ဘဝတိုင်းဆုံတွေ့ချင်ပါသလား).

He currently resides at the Dhammayawei Monastery (ဓမ္မရဝေကျောင်းတိုက်) in Thingangyungyi ward, Mingaladon Township, Yangon.
