= Taïkan Jyoji =

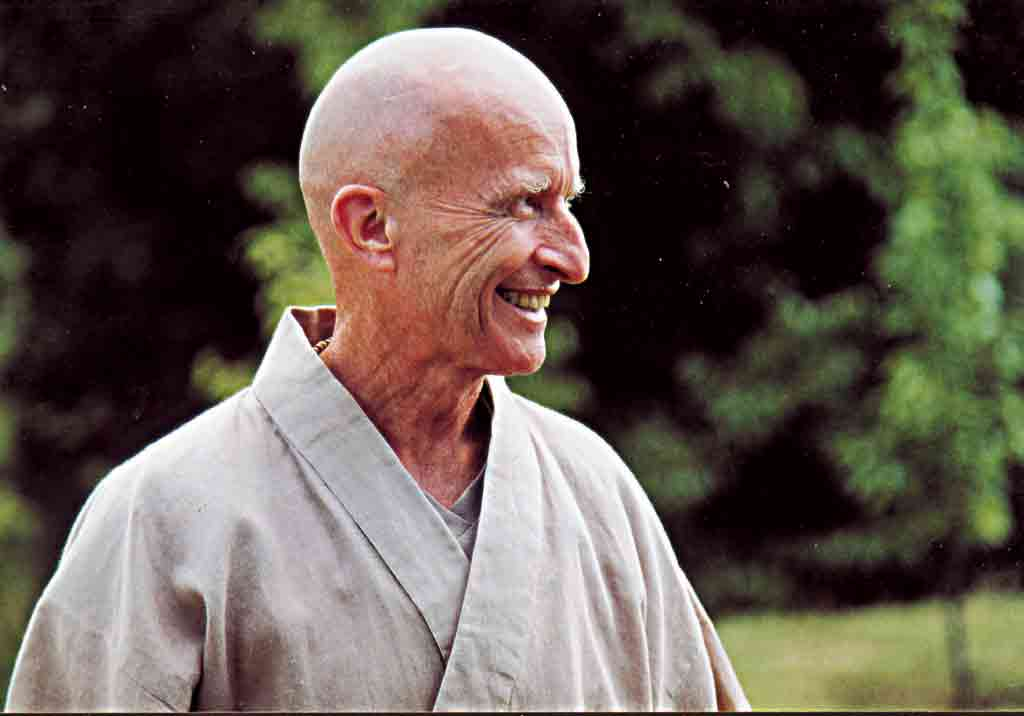
Maître Taikan Jyoji

Taïkan Jyoji (born 1941) is a French Zen teacher and representative for Europe of the Rinzai school of Zen. He was officially installed in this function by Yamada Mumon Rôshi in 1976. He is the founder of the Falaise Verte Zen Centre, the first Rinzai Zen center in Europe, as well as several other Zen groups and centers active in France and Belgium.

== Zen training ==
He first travelled to Japan in 1964. In 1968 he joined the Zen temple of Shōfuku-ji. He was ordained by Yamada Mumon Rōshi in 1970. In 1989, Taïkan Jyoji was given the title of Kaikyo-shi (Founding Master) for Europe.

== The Falaise Verte Zen Centre ==
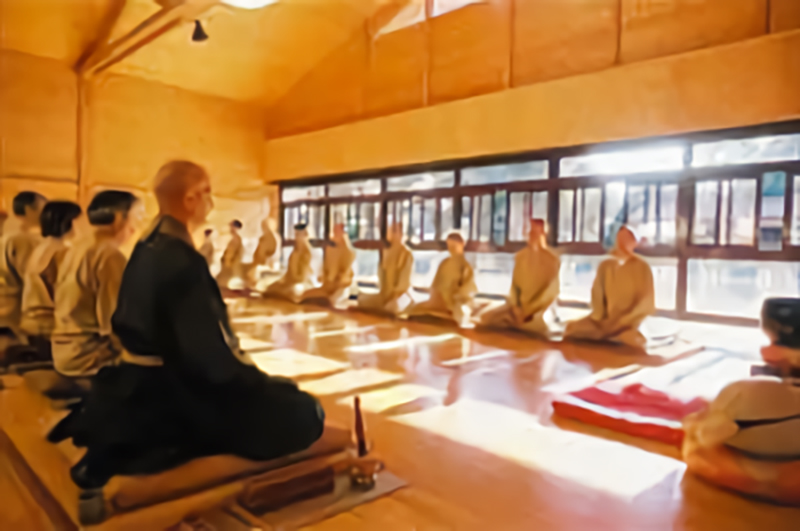
Zazen in the centre

In 1987, Taïkan Jyoji founded Falaise Verte Zen Centre, located in the Ardèche region of France, near the village of Saint Laurent du Pape. The center, which is also named the "Shobo-ji Temple" (Temple of the Authentic Dharma), is directly linked with the Myoshin-ji headtemple.

The center is composed of a zendo, the meditation place, and a Kyūdō dōjō, where the Japanese art of archery is practiced. In June 2010, the zendo was consecrated by a Japanese delegation of temple's masters led by Kancho Taïtsu Roshi, head of Myoshin-ji.

In March 2017, Taïkan Jyoji was honored by the Japanese Government, receiving a price for his cultural contributions.

He has written numerous books on Zen and Kyūdō. He is a regular guest on the program Sagesses Bouddhistes on France 2.

== Bibliography ==
French

- La source du vide, Éditions Le Courrier du Livre, Paris,1989
- Zen et zazen, Éditions Le Courrier du Livre, Paris, 1991
- Au coeur du Zen,Éditions Le Courrier du Livre, Paris, 1996
- Exhortations zen, Éditions Le Courrier du Livre, Paris, 1996
- Itinéraire d'un maître zen venu d'Occident, Éditions Almora, Paris, réédité 2008
- L'art du kôan zen, Éditions Albin Michel Spiritualité, Paris, 2001
- Zen au fil des jours, Éditions Le Courrier du Livre, Paris, 2006
- Un jour - une vie (Tome 1), Éditions Almora, Paris, 2011
- Un jour - une vie (Tome 2), Éditions Almora, Paris, 2012
- Un jour - une vie (Tome 3), Éditions Almora, Paris, 2015
- Correspondence d'un maître Zen, Éditions Almora, Paris, 2014
- Kyudo, tir à l'arc zen, Éditions Le Courrier du Livre, Paris, 2014
- Les Saveurs du Zen, (Cookbook in collaboration with Françoise Dye), Éditions Almora, Paris, 2009

German

- Tagebuch eines Zen-Meisters, der aus dem Westen kam. Benziger Verlag, Zürich 1997, ISBN 3-545-20136-8
