= Niklaus Brantschen =

Swiss Jesuit and Zen master

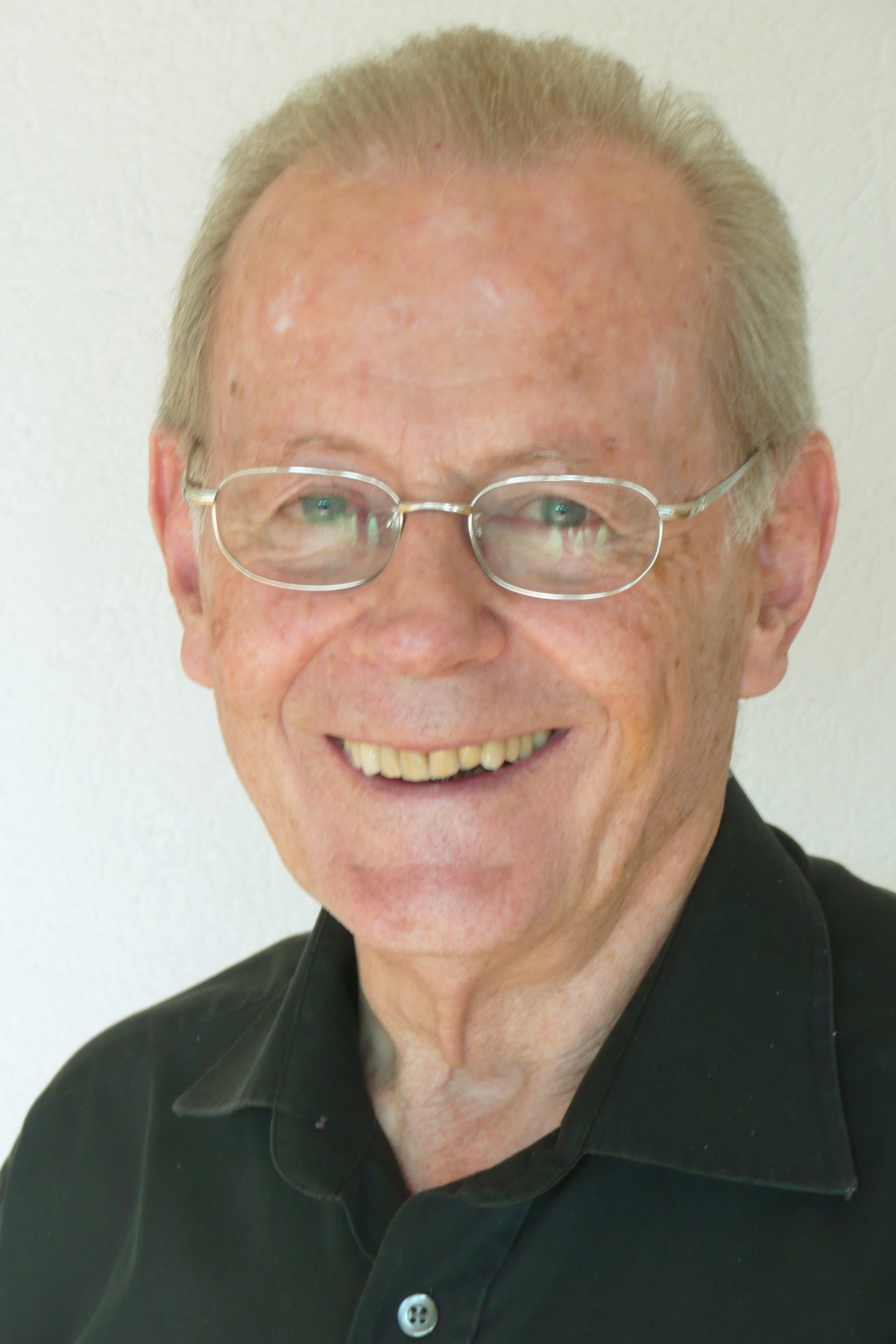
Fr. Niklaus Brantschen S.J.

Niklaus Brantschen (born 25 October 1937 in Randa, Valais) is a Swiss Jesuit, Zen master of the White Plum Sangha line and founder of the Lassalle-Institute within the Lassalle-House in Bad Schönbrunn/Zug, Canton of Zug. He is co-initiator of the Jerusalem-Project.

== Early life ==
Niklaus Brantschen grew up with six brothers and sisters in a traditionally Catholic family; he is a skilled mountaineer.

When he was 22 years old, he joined the Society of Jesus. After the novitiate in Villars-sur-Glâne he received the licentiate of the Munich School of Philosophy in 1964. As practical studies he worked from 1964 to 1967 as an educator at Stella Matutina in Feldkirch, Austria followed by three years of theology studies at the university of Fourvière, Lyon, France and a fourth year at the University of Tübingen, among others from the professors Eberhard Jüngel, Jürgen Moltmann, Walter Kasper, Hans Küng; Licentiate work about Dietrich Bonhoeffer. In 1970, he celebrated his first Mass (liturgy) in Randa. From 1973 he made a certificate study in adult's education in Munich as assistant of meditation teacher Klemens Tilmann, followed by meditation courses with Karlfried Graf Dürckheim.

== Zen education ==
From 1976, he made regular education stays for Zen studies in Kamakura, Kamakura/Japan with Hugo Makibi Enomiya-Lassalle and Yamada Kôun Roshi. There, meetings with Heinrich Dumoulin, Jerry Brown, Willigis Jäger, Johannes Kopp. In 1988, he was given the teaching competence for Zen by Yamada Roshi, in 1999 he received the confirmation of a Zen master ("inka shōmei") from Tetsugen Bernard Glassman.

In 1986, Brantschen met Jerry Brown in Japan and held inspiring conversations, 1987 he practised Zen together also with him.

== Other activities ==
Between 1973 and 1977, Brantschen was assistant manager of the educational institution Bad Schönbrunn near Menzingen, until 1987 he was its manager. For the next five years he worked as a student minister at different colleges in Zürich. In 1993, he positioned the educational institution Bad Schönbrunn new as a centre for spirituality and social consciousness and renamed it Lassalle-Haus. In 1995, together with Pia Gyger, he founded the Lassalle-Institut, an institution in the fields of Zen, ethics and leadership, which they both led until 2002. Within the institute both are involved especially in the project Jerusalem – Open town for learning of the peace in the world which takes them regularly to Jerusalem and to the UN in New York.

== Interfaith dialogue ==
According to Brantschen there is no alternative to the interfaith dialogue. Interfaith dialogue is not only conversation, but also the positive, constructive relations between persons and communities of other religions for their mutual enrichment. "To be religious today calls to be interreligious, not only bilaterally but multilaterally.“

== Position on Buddhism ==
Brantschen considers the dialog with Buddhism as an enriching, but not straight or concluded way between the East and West, which springs up in the suspense between real Zen-experience and imitation of Christ. He sees strong parallels between Christian spiritual exercises and Zen-practice, which for him have formed a synthesis during the years.

The practice of Zen is a way to remove the barriers between religions, nations and races – to create a united humanity.

== Partnership of man and woman ==
Brantschen is of the belief that collaboration in partnership is an important factor for a global change. He described humanity as “...a bird with both wings like man and woman. If a wing is not equally developed, we do have a banking bird which cannot make his way.“

== Judgments ==
In his characteristic style Brantschen summarizes his judgments in concise sentences:

- Only one who is unselfish, is really happy.
- Who hangs on his spiritual experiences and wants to preserve them, destroys them and obstructs his way to the new.
- A man is not what he "does"; he is not what he "has"; he is not what he "is"; he is what he loves.
- Ethics, which we mean, founds in the careful percipience of life in all of its forms, in clever judgment, and in suitable lasting action for the well-being of all. This is not possible without comprehensive self- and world-experience, without a more profound view of the reality.

== Published works ==
Brantschen has written 14 books, most in German, some edited in Italian or Spanish.
