= Achan Sobin S. Namto =

Thai Buddhist monk and Vipassana meditation master (1931–2023)

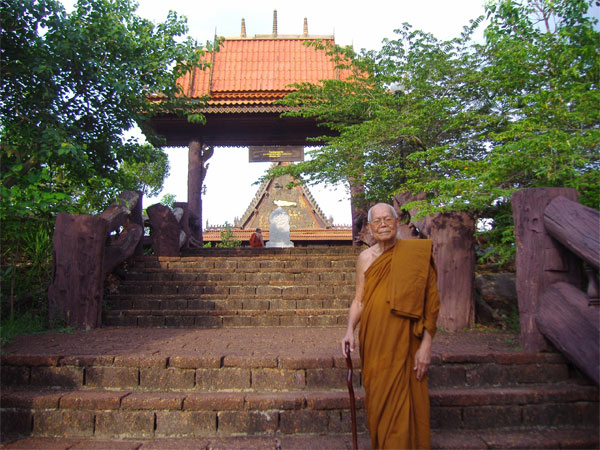
- Achan Sobin S. Namto in Thailand
- Title: Achan

Personal life
- Born: Sobin Namto; 31 December 1931 Ban Wang Pla Do, Borabue, Maha Sarakham, Thailand
- Died: 23 January 2023 (aged 91)
- Website: vipassanadhura.com

Religious life
- Religion: Theravada, Maha Nikaya
- Dharma name: Sopakobodhi โสปาโกโพธิ

Senior posting
- Teacher: Mahasi Sayadaw, Chao Khun Bhavanapirama Thera
- Based in: Wat Wang Pla Do

Achan Sobin S. Namto (Thai: พระอาจารย์โสบิน ส. นามโท; 11 December 1931 – 23 January 2023) was a Thai Buddhist monk who taught Vipassana meditation and Buddhist psychology in Southeast Asia and North America for over 50 years.

== Biography ==
Born in Thailand on December 11, 1931, Sobin S. Namto became a novice monk in 1945 at Wat Mahathat in Bangkok, under Abbot Somdej Phra Budthacharn, and began his study of Vipassanā there. He was sent to Rangoon, Burma (now Yangon, Myanmar), for further study and then taught in Thailand. In 1960-62, he taught in Luang Prabang, Laos. Returning to Thailand, he resumed teaching and founded the Vidhayakorn Institute in Southern Thailand, He was one of the monks selected to establish the first Thai temple in Los Angeles, California, and was appointed its first Abbot. He was also the founder-Abbot of a Vipassana temple in Denver, Colorado. After many years of teaching in North America, he returned to teach at the wat in his home village Wangplado, in Borabue, Maha Sarakham province, North-East Thailand. Achan Sobin is the author of three books on Vipassanā meditation in English, as well as a book on Buddhist ordination.

Namto died on 23 January 2023, at the age of 91, and was cremated a few days later.

== Works ==
Wayfaring: A Manual for Insight Meditation. Buddhist Publication Society. Kandy, Sri Lanka, 1979. Reprinted 1984.

Moment by Moment Mindfulness: A Pictorial Guide for Meditators. Vipassana Dhura Meditation Society , Fawnskin, California, 1985.

Insight Meditation: Practical Steps to Ultimate Truth. Vipassana Dhura Meditation Society , Fawnskin, California, 1989. Reprinted January 2005. ISBN 978-94-7835-785-4.
