= Phra Dhammavisuddhikavi =

Thai Buddhist monk and scholar (1936–2024)

Somdet Phra Mahāmunīwong (Pichitr Thitavanno)

Personal life
- Born: Pichitr Thawonsuwan; 24 June 1936 Amphoe Sathing Phra, Songkhla Province, Thailand
- Died: 25 December 2024 (aged 88)
- Education: Bachelor's degree in Religious Studies, High Certificate from Training

Religious life
- Religion: Buddhism
- School: Theravada, Dhammayuttika Nikaya
- Dharma name: Thitavanno

Somdet Phra Mahāmunīwong (Thai: สมเด็จพระมหามุนีวงศ์; born Phichit Thawornsuwan พิจิตร ถาวรสุวรรณ, monastic name Thitavanno ฐิตวณฺโณ; 24 June 1936 – 25 December 2024) was a senior Thai Buddhist monk of the Dhammayuttika Nikaya. He was the former abbot of Wat Somanas Rajavaravihara, a member of the Supreme Sangha Council (as adviser), and advisor to the ecclesiastical region of Bangkok and Southern Thailand.

== Biography ==
=== Early life ===
Somdet Phra Mahāmunīwong was born Phichit Thawornsuwan on 24 June 1936 in Phang Kham village, Sathing Phra District, Songkhla Province, Thailand. He was the eldest of nine children of Kaew and Pho-lian Thawornsuwan. After his parents moved away for work, he was raised by his grandmother, Chum Jaemsai. At age eight he moved to Don Khan village, where he attended Luesit Witthaya School, Wat Thammapradit, completing his primary education before working with his parents.

=== Ordination ===
At age 15, he requested ordination, but his parents refused, asking him to wait three more years. During this time, he worked diligently and trained at Wat Thammapradit. In 1953, at age 17, he was ordained as a novice at Wat Somanas Rajavaravihara, under Phra Udomsilakhun (Roem Nandiyo) and Phra Vinayavongweti (Phuang Dhammatharo). The ordination was presided over by Somdet Phra Wanarat (Chap Thitthammo). As a novice, he excelled in Pali studies, passing level 3 of the Pali examinations and achieving the highest rank in Dhamma studies.

On 6 June 1956, at the age of 20, he was fully ordained at Wat Somanas. His preceptor was Somdet Phra Wanarat (Chap Thitthammo), while Phra Ratchakavi (Am Dhammadatto) served as kammavācācariya (chanting master).

=== Education ===
- 1956 – Passed Pali grade 3 and highest-level Dhamma studies (Nak Tham Ek).
- 1957 – Passed Pali grade 4, memorized the Patimokkha.
- 1958 – Passed Pali grade 5.
- 1960 – Passed Pali grade 6.
- 1962 – Passed Pali grade 7.
- 1966 – Passed Pali grade 8, completed B.A. in Buddhist Studies with second-class honours from Mahamakut Buddhist University.
- 1968 – Diploma in Dhammaduta training (foreign missionary monks).
- 1969 – Won a scholarship from Mahamakut Buddhist University to study Sanskrit literature in India.
- 1971 – M.A. in Sanskrit Literature, diploma in Hindi language from Banaras Hindu University, India.
- 1974 – Passed Pali grade 9 (highest level).

=== Death ===
Somdet Phra Mahāmunīwong was admitted to Chulalongkorn Hospital in December 2024 and later transferred to Priest Hospital for physical rehabilitation. He died peacefully on 25 December 2024, aged 88, in his 68th rains-retreats as a monk.

On 27 December 2024, King Vajiralongkorn appointed Privy Council president Surayud Chulanont as his representative to preside over the royal bathing rite at Wat Somanas.

The royal cremation ceremony took place on 27 April 2025, presided over by Princess Maha Chakri Sirindhorn at Wat Thepsirin.

== Ecclesiastical titles ==
- 5 December 1976 – Elevated to the rank of Phra Srisuddhikavi (royal ecclesiastical title).
- 5 December 1988 – Promoted to Phra Ratchavisuddhikavi.
- 5 December 1993 – Elevated to Phra Thepvisuddhikavi.
- 5 December 2000 – Elevated to Phra Thammavisuddhikavi.
- 5 December 2009 – Elevated to Phra Sasanasopon.
- 28 July 2019 – Elevated to Somdet Phra Mahāmunīwong.

== Administrative roles ==
- 1975–1996 – Assistant abbot, Wat Somanas.
- 1986–1997 – Deputy ecclesiastical governor of regions 16–18 (Dhammayut).
- 1996–2024 – Abbot of Wat Somanas.
- 1997–2016 – Ecclesiastical governor of regions 16–18 (Dhammayut).
- 2016–2024 – Advisor to ecclesiastical governors of regions 16–18.
- 2019–2024 – Advisor to the Supreme Sangha Council.

== Works and contributions ==
- Authored more than 63 books on Buddhism, of which 20 were published by Mahamakut Buddhist University.
- Meditation teacher at Wat Somanas and Mahamakut Buddhist University, with more than 20 years’ experience.
- Lecturer in Buddhist Studies for both undergraduate and graduate levels.
- Travelled to more than 20 countries for Buddhist education and missionary work.

== Works ==
- A Buddhist Way of Mental Training (2001), Chuan Printing Press, Bangkok.
- Over 70 additional titles on Buddhism and meditation in Thai.

== Succession ==
Preceded by Somdet Phra Nyanasamvara	Supreme Patriarch of Thailand; 2017–2018	Succeeded by Somdet Phra Ariyavongsagatanana (Amborn Ambaro)
