= Pia Gyger =

Swiss special education specialist and Zen master

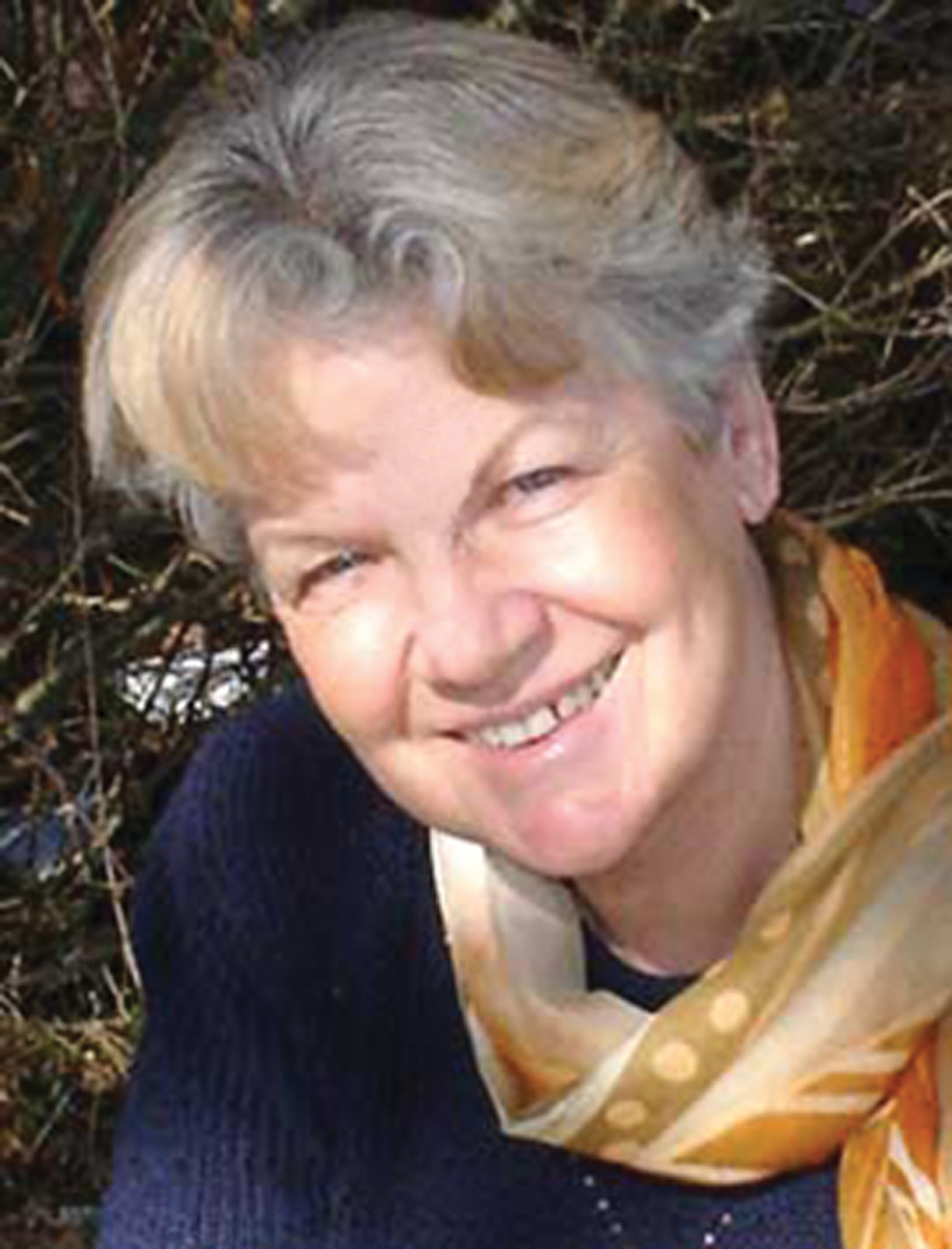
Pia Gyger

Pia Gyger (born 2 November 1940 in Schaffhausen; died 14 July 2014 in Basel) was a Swiss specialist for special education, psychologist and Zen master of the White Plum Sangha lineage. She was the co-founder of the Lassalle-Institute within the Lassalle-House in Bad Schönbrunn/Zug, Canton of Zug. She was co-initiator of the Jerusalem-Project.

== Education ==
Gyger studied 1972–1976 special education (i.e. education, training, raising and promotion of children and young persons with development impairments and handicaps) and psychology at the Zurich University of Applied Sciences.

== Zen education ==
In the years 1976–1999, she was educated in Zen in Kamakura, Kanagawa/Japan with Hugo Makibi Enomiya-Lassalle and Yamada Kôun Roshi in Hawaii. She received Dharma transmission from Aitken Rōshi and was also taken up in the Buddhist Peace Fellowship to co-operate in international peace projects. In 1999, she was confirmed as Zen master ("inka shōmei") by Tetsugen Bernard Glassman.

== Activities ==
In 1969 Gyger joined the ecumenical community with inter-religious orientation Saint Katharina-Werk, Basel. On behalf of the Federal Department of Justice and Police she founded 1976 a therapy home near Horw for particularly difficult young persons which she led until 1982. Subsequently she was nominated general leader of the Saint Katharina-Werk. In 1986, she founded a project for meetings of the world’s religions and in 1989 she initiated in a slum on the outskirts of Manila a school for the spiritual and political awareness of young people. 1995, back in Switzerland, she founded together with Niklaus Brantschen the Lassalle-Institute of Zen – Ethics – Leadership which they led until 2002 and at which she is teaching. Brantschen and she founded in 2003 the Lassalle-Zen-line and the school of contemplation „Via Integralis“. After that they developed the project Jerusalem – Open town for learning of the peace in the world which is accredited at the UN and leads them regularly to Jerusalem and to New York.

== Bibliography ==
Gyger is author of 7 books edited in German.
