= John Earl Coleman =

Vipassana Meditation Teacher (1930–2012)

John Earl Coleman (26 March 1930 – 22 November 2012) was a teacher of Vipassanā (insight) meditation, a form of meditation in Theravada Buddhism. He was born in Tresckow, a mining town in Pennsylvania. After attending his studies, he entered the US Army in the 1950s and served in Korea during the war. Afterwards he joined the newly formed Central Intelligence Agency, and was stationed in Thailand in the late 1950s and early 1960s. He worked officially for the Southeast Asia (SEA) Supply Corporation, advisers to the government of Thailand, as a specialist in criminology.

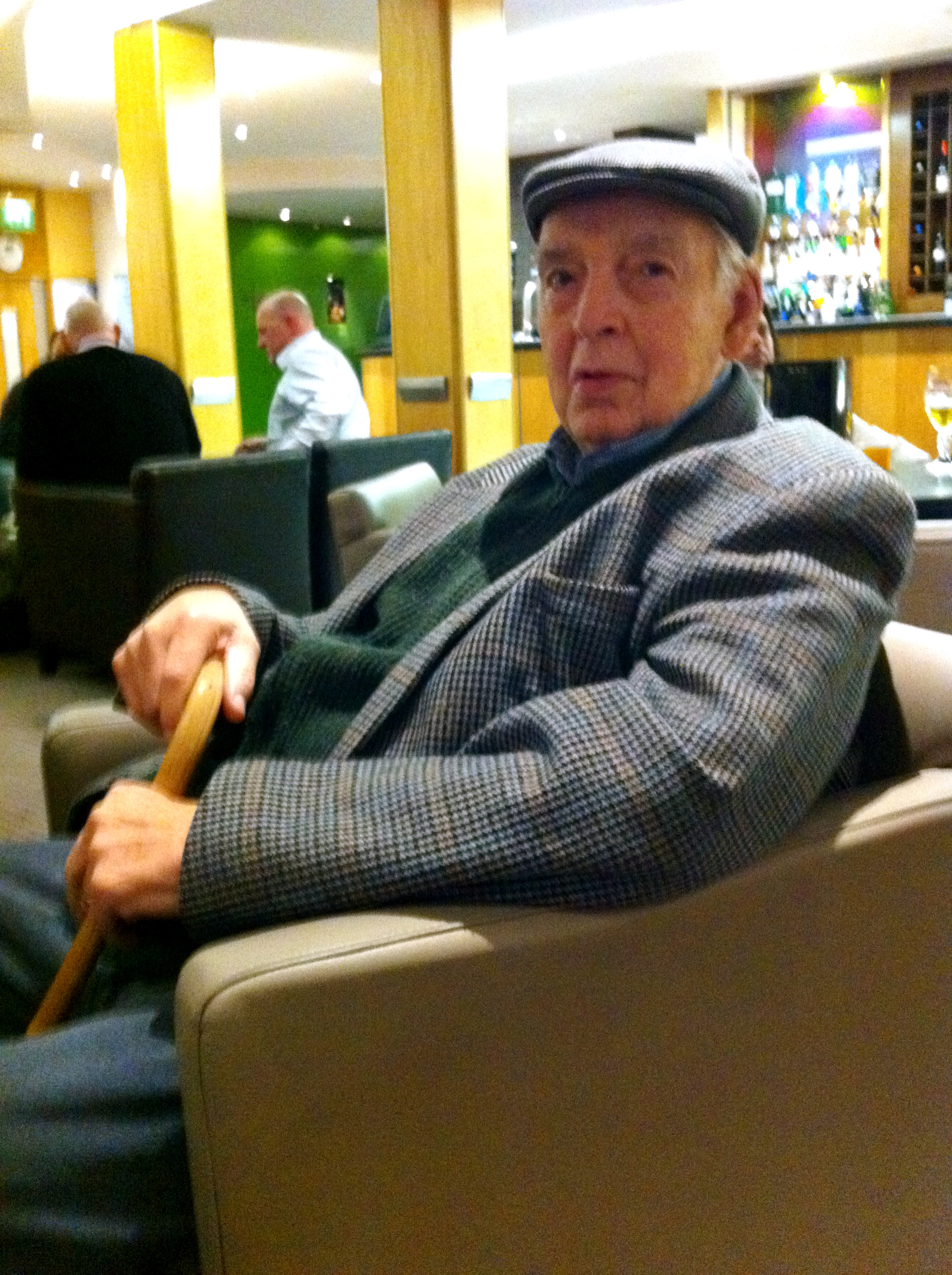

== Vipassanā Meditation ==
During his years in Thailand he started to take an interest in Vipassanā meditation. Working for the CIA, Mr Coleman used his free time to explore different spiritual paths, as documented in his book The Quiet Mind (1971). He traveled through India, Burma, Japan and Thailand and encountered such legendary spiritual teachers as Jiddu Krishnamurti, Maharishi, and D. T. Suzuki.

After several attempts to study Vipassanā meditation with different monks in Thailand, his search for peace of mind and liberating insights came to fruition in Yangon/Rangoon under the tutelage of the great Vipassanā meditation master Sayagyi U Ba Khin, who had established the International Meditation Center. Sayagyi U Ba Khin was also the teacher of S. N. Goenka and Mya Thwin, also known as Mother Sayamagyi.

At the International Meditation Center in Rangoon Mr Coleman sat a 10-day Vipassanā course with Sayagyi U Ba Khin. In his book he says about the experience, "My enthusiasm to learn let me down. I spent a good part of my time analyzing, speculating, making copious notes, and in my zeal I’m afraid I missed the whole object of the exercise."

He was perhaps being overly critical of himself. He had certainly gained something because otherwise he would have gone on his way and never looked back. Instead, a few years later Mr Coleman returned to Sayagyi's center in Yangon for another course of meditation. This time, he writes, "I put away all my notebooks, pencils and papers and tape recorder and prepared myself to let come what may."

He describes how he immersed himself in the experience of Vipassanā. He went through stages familiar to any meditator. And once he stopped striving to understand, understanding came to him in a moment of transcendent insight. He writes, "I cannot, and never will, lose the memory of that moment. It will always remain absolutely unforgettable and ineradicable in my mind."

== Lineage ==
Coleman's method of practising Vipassanā is based on ten day retreats as he learned from Sayagyi U Ba Khin. Ba Khin elaborated this method especially for householders with families and jobs. Ba Khin himself learned Vipassanā from a layman, Saya Thetgyi, whose teacher was the monk Ledi Sayadaw. Another important teacher of Ba Khin was the monk Webu Sayadaw, who was considered an arhat.

== Teaching Meditation ==
After his travels in Asia, Mr Coleman resumed an ordinary life with his family in England. But in the early 1970s he began to receive visits from young people who had studied Vipassanā with S. N. Goenka in India. At first, Mr Coleman dismissed all such requests to teach meditation. In those years S. N. Goenka was unable to travel to other countries, so he referred some of those western students who were very keen to learn more to Mr Coleman and some others also authorized to teach in the West by Sayagyi U Ba Khin. After his own refresher course with S. N. Goenka in Dalhousie, India, in the mid-1970s, Mr Coleman returned to Europe and at the students’ urging and with S. N. Goenka’s encouragement, Mr Coleman began to conduct 10-day courses in earnest. He was associated with the International Meditation Centre in the UK for a few years. After resigning as the President of IMC-UK in the 1980's, he continued teaching Vipassanā courses on his own, in many countries all over the world. His teaching career spanned three decades, and he taught regularly in Italy with courses organized by the International Meditation Center (IMC) of Italy, where he authorized some Italian old students to teach on his behalf. He gradually cut back on his teaching schedule in his later years, finally retiring from teaching meditation in 2009.

As a teacher, his style was informal and included humour, while being deprecating with a dead pan seriousness. While being a large in physicality, he was possessed with extensive knowledge of meditation, which he applied during intensive sessions. He did not prefer to be named a guru but rather saw himself as a good friend, always ready to help his students with simple and foolproof tips on meditation.

== Autobiography and other Books ==
His story and his method of teaching meditation is described in his autobiography "The Quiet Mind" and also the italian version, La Mente Tranquilla. - The important Italian writer, Tiziano Terzani, in one of his best-sellers, Un indovino mi disse, describes his ten day's meditation retreat with Mr. Coleman, in 1993. Also another writer, Tim Parks, describes a course with Coleman as teacher, in his book "Teach Us To Sit Still". Moreover, the Italian writer Emilio Lonardo describes his experience as student of john Coleman in his book "Sulla rotta dei ribelli".

== Death ==
John Coleman was diagnosed with prostate cancer in late 2006. He maintained his composure even facing the final stages of cancer. Months before his death, when meditation students telephoned him, he would joke with them and then talk about meditation. He died on the morning of November 22, 2012 in Cookham, England.
