= In-depth-systemics =

Extension of the field of systemic therapy and counseling approaches

In-depth systemics is a context independent professional work approach and an extension of the field of systemic therapy and counseling approaches. The following elements are integrated: (a) classical systemic (family) therapy, (b) reconstructive work based on the principles of objective hermeneutics, (c) coopetition as an expression of the dialectic relationship of cooperation and competition, and (d) as the central core element, Vipassana-meditation in the tradition of Sayagyi U Ba Khin as taught by S.N. Goenka. Vipassana-meditation plays an essential role in the development of mindfulness and inner wisdom about oneself. It is an instrument to coordinate unconscious perceptions to reach a deeper dimension, which cannot be achieved through traditional therapeutic or counseling methods.

== History ==
The development of in-depth systemics derives from therapeutic works of Gerhard Scholz and Sergio Mantovani with drug addicts in the early 1990s in Zürich (Switzerland). They observed that the root cause of drug addiction is a basic addiction to existence itself. Addiction is not (just) the craving for pharmaceutical substances but rather an existential desire and craving for pleasant physical sensations, which the consummation of drugs can produce. Hence, addiction is a deeply unconscious habitual way of mental reaction: craving for pleasant and aversion against unpleasant physical bodily sensations. These bodily sensations arise through various sensory stimuli and change constantly.

This innovative view of addiction can easily be applied to non-substance related addictions as well, such as gambling, online activities, sexuality, an excessive preoccupation with one's looks, eating, sports, etc., as well as with secondary phenomena, such as the desire for power or prestige.

After using in-depth systemics in stationary drug therapy since 1992, the model was extended in 2001 and first applied to the field of case management interventions (particularly high cost cases). The goal was not only a recovery from personal deficits but also to support the personal development and autonomy of clients. Later, in-depth systemics was applied to business leadership as well as the coaching of sport prodigies (competitive athletes). In 2010, a day center for youths and young adults was established, based on the principles of in-depth systemics, with the goal of offering clients a structure to motivate them to work on a long-term professional perspective.

== The in-depth systemics model and its changes ==
While working with heavy drug addicts, a model based on four pillars was designed: (1) daily life as therapy versus therapy as daily life, (2) systemic individual, partner, and family therapy, (3) various(?) self-help concepts, and (4) meditation techniques (Anapana-sati and Vipassana-meditation as taught by S.N. Goenka). The totality of these elements was included in the statutes of the association start again and labeled explicitly as in-depth systemics.

The application of the work in various contexts (e.g., case management, business leadership, coaching of prodigies) required a strong redesign and extension of the model. Vipassana-meditation became the central core, because it provides the actual instrument to initiate real personal transformation. It empowers practitioners to perceive themselves in a direct, realistic, and undistorted way - from moment to moment in the here-and-now. The goal is the development of equanimity to counteract the habitual addictive attitude at the existential level: the acceptance of unpleasant sensations and the relinquishing of craving for pleasant physical sensations. As a result, the inner world is perceived accurately and realistically. Mediated through the sensory organs, the outer world is also perceived more accurately and undistorted. As a consequence, individual actions become freer from reactions, since decisions are less influenced by habitual inner reactions than by the particularities of the specific case. The achieved autonomy flows into the application of the principles of coopetition, qualification, and reconstructive understanding.

The extension of the addiction based model required the re-definition of elements: self-help was used to develop the dialectic concept of coopetition. Coopetition means that an individual experiences simultaneously aspects of cooperation as well as competition within every professional context. Both must be integrated in the dialectical sense to act efficiently and effectively professionally.

Systemic therapy was translated into two parts: qualification and relational/reconstructive understanding. Qualification means that the minimum requirement but not the goal of every professional work context is the content-oriented qualification of the individual. Relational/reconstructive understanding on the other hand refers to the reconstructive ability, along the principles of the objective hermeneutics case analysis, to combine all available information of a case to work out its essential challenges.

The described three cornerstones of the model should not to be understood as fixed but might change depending on the particular working context. This is based on the conviction that the application of the model within a new context must be done each time anew to remain sensitive to the particularities of each case. However, the central core element of Vipassana-meditation remains fixed, because only through the practice of Vipassana-meditation and the observation of one's own bodily sensations with equanimity can personal transformation of one's own mental-somatic models be realized.

== Working procedure ==
Central for in-depth systemics work is the continuous practice of one's own individual mental-somatic models through the practice of Vipassana-meditation as taught by S.N. Goenka. This ensures that apart from the ongoing development of professional qualifications, reconstructive understanding, and coopetition, the transformative processes in the depth of the mind are maintained. Vipassana-meditation can be learned in initial 10-day retreats, after which individuals can continue to practice the meditation technique autonomously.

== Scientific evaluation ==
Between 1992 and 1998, a scientific evaluation of the drug therapy center start again (Zürich/ CH) took place, which is based on in-depth systemics principles. The research study was financially supported by the Swiss federal office of justice. The task was to investigate whether therapy instead of prison in the context of severe drug addiction has a positive empirical outcome for the target group. A conservative criterion was chosen to define recovery from drug addiction empirically and to measure therapeutic success. The study followed a mixed-methods research design by combining qualitative as well as quantitative methodologies: case reconstructive work based on objective hermeneutical analysis as well as statistical calculations of therapeutic success by means of Bayesian statistics for small samples

The main results of the study showed that 2/3 of the clients who completed the whole therapeutic program could be classified as a success in accordance with the chosen conservative criterion for therapeutic success. No significant differences were found between men and women and between clients who participated voluntarily and those who chose a “therapy instead of prison” sentence. Vipassana-meditation was identified as an important predictor for the prevention of serious relapse. However, Vipassana-meditation did not predict therapeutic success. Urban Studer, the author of the study concluded that it is the institution with its in-depth systemics program as a whole that works rather than a single isolated factor.

Between 2007 and 2010, a qualitative catamnestic follow-up study with former clients of start again was conducted to reconstruct retrospectively their personal and professional biography after leaving the therapeutic program. Based on objective hermeneutical analyses, a model was developed to describe recovery from drug addiction. The model was applied to the clients’ life course after therapy and allowed the derivation of testable predictions. The model contains the following steps: (1) small steps, (2) small changes, (3) transformation of vulnerabilities to resources, and (4) the dissolution of the dependence on resources as well as vulnerabilities. The studied clients reached level (3) and one client showed evidence of level (4).

A systematic scientific evaluation of in-depth systemics in case management, business leadership, and coaching of sports prodigies has not been conducted yet.
