= Dhamma Joti =

Vipassana meditation center in Myanmar

Dhamma Joti Vipassana Meditation Center

Religion
- Affiliation: Buddhism

Location
- Location: Nga Htat Gyi Pagoda Road Bahan Township, Yangon, Myanmar (Burma).
- Country: Myanmar

Architecture
- Founder: S. N. Goenka
- Completed: October 1993

Website
- http://www.joti.dhamma.org/index.html

Dhamma Joti is one of the first Vipassana meditation centres in Myanmar, founded by S.N Goenka in the tradition of Sayagyi U Ba Kin in accordance with the teaching of Ledi Sayadaw. The centre is situated on an area about 12 acres contributed by the venerable Bhaddanta Sobhita of Wingabar Yele Monastery. It has been conducting Vipassana meditation courses since October 1993. The courses include 10 days for new students, and 3 days, 7 days and Sunday group sitting for old students.
