= Ledi Sayadaw =

Key Figure in the Vipassana Movement

Ledi Sayadaw U Ñāṇadhaja
- လယ်တီဆရာတော် ဦးဉာဏဓဇ
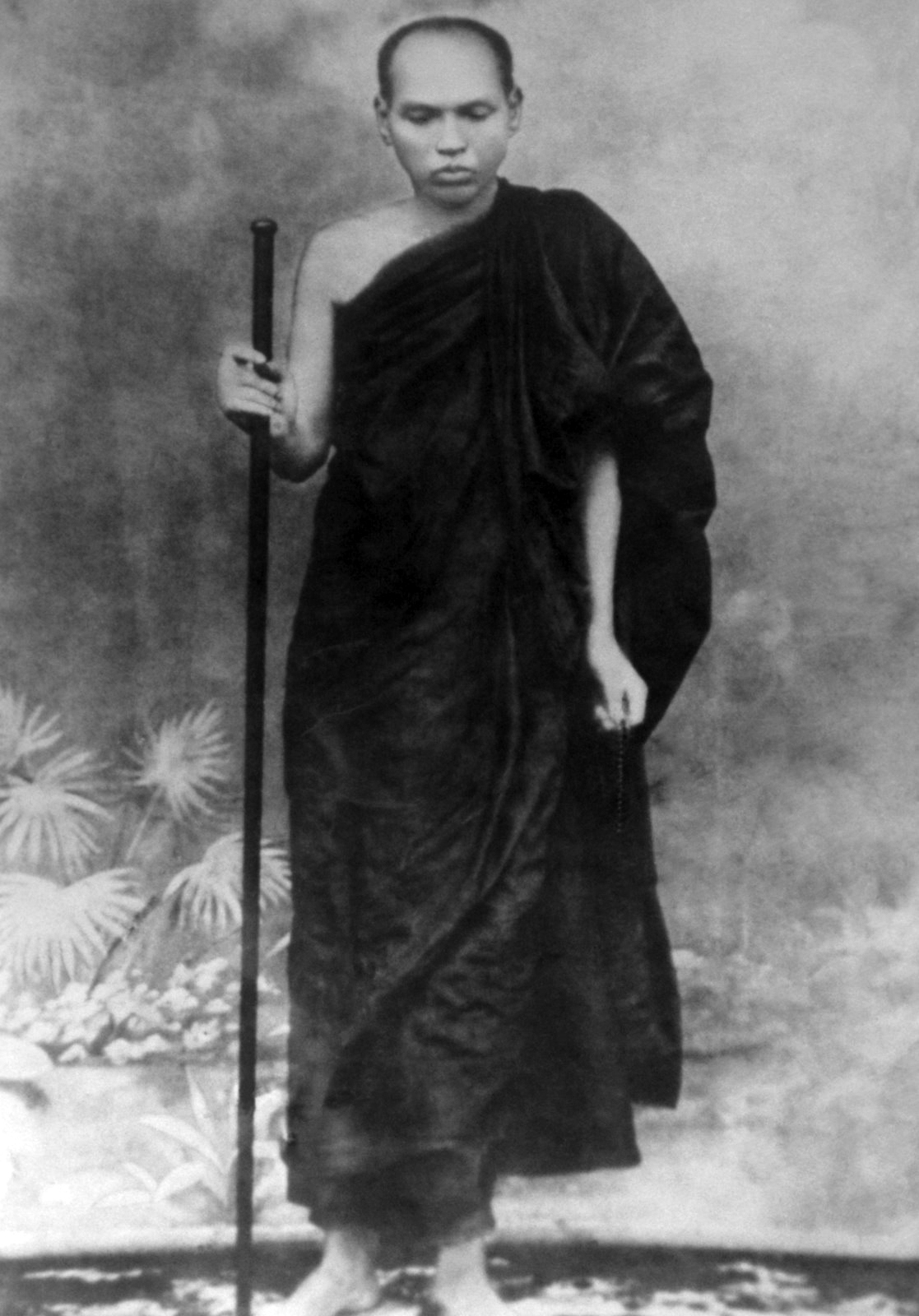
- The Venerable Ledi Sayadaw
- Title: Sayadaw

Personal life
- Born: Tet Khaung; 1 December 1846 (13th waxing of Nadaw 1208 ME) Saingpyin, Dabayin; Kingdom of Burma
- Died: 27 June 1923 (aged 76) Pyinmana, Mandalay Province, British Burma
- Education: Agga Maha Pandita, D.Litt. (Hons.)
- Occupation: Buddhist monk

Religious life
- Religion: Buddhism
- School: Theravada
- Lineage: Ledi
- Dharma name: Ñāṇadhaja ဉာဏဓဇ

Senior posting
- Based in: Ledi Monastery, Monywa
- Students: Anagami Thet Gyi, Ledi Pandita U Maung Gyi

Ledi Sayadaw U Ñaṇadhaja (Burmese: လယ်တီဆရာတော် ဦးဉာဏဓဇ, pronounced [lɛ̀dì sʰəjàdɔ̀ ʔú ɲàna̰dəza̰]; 1 December 1846 – 27 June 1923) was an influential Theravada Buddhist monk. He was recognised from a young age as being developed in both the theory (Abhidhamma) and practice of Buddhism and so was revered as being scholarly. He wrote many books on Dhamma in Burmese and these were accessible even to a serious lay person, hence he was responsible for spreading Dhamma to all levels of society and reviving the traditional practice of Vipassanā meditation, making it more available for renunciates and lay people alike.

== Biography ==
Sayadaw began his studies at age 20 in Mandalay at Thanjaun. While there he was considered to be a bright and ambitious young monk but his work was scholarly; there is no evidence that Sayadaw engaged in a serious meditation practice during his years in Mandalay. Leaving Mandalay after a great fire in 1883 caused the loss of his home and his written work to that time, Sayadaw returned to the village of his youth.

Soon, Sayadaw founded a forest monastery in the "Ledi forest" and began practicing and teaching intensive meditation. It was from this monastery that he would take his name, Ledi Sayadaw, meaning "respected teacher of the Ledi forest." In 1885, Ledi Sayadaw wrote the Nwa-myitta-sa (နွားမေတ္တာစာ), a poetic prose letter that argued that Burmese Buddhists should not kill cattle and eat beef, since Burmese farmers depended on them as beasts of burden to maintain their livelihoods, that the marketing of beef for human consumption threatened the extinction of buffalo and cattle and that the practice was ecologically unsound. He subsequently led successful beef boycotts during the colonial era, despite the presence of beef eating among locals and influenced a generation of Burmese nationalists in adopting this stance.

In 1900, Sayadaw gave up control of the monastery and pursued more focused meditation in the mountain caves near the banks of the Chindwin River.

At other times he traveled throughout Burma. Because of his knowledge of pariyatti (theory), he was able to write many books on Dhamma in both Pali and Burmese languages such as, Paramattha-dipani (Manual of Ultimate Truth), Nirutta-dipani, a book on Pali grammar and The Manuals of Dhamma. At the same time he kept alive the pure tradition of patipatti (practice) by teaching the technique of Vipassana to a few people.

== Legacy ==
Ledi Sayadaw (လယ်တီ ဆရာတော်) was one of the foremost Burmese Buddhist figures of his age. He was instrumental in reviving the traditional practice of Vipassana, making it more available for renunciates and lay people alike. Many of his works are still available, including in English through the Buddhist Publication Society.

After Ledi Sayadaw died in 1923, influential teachers, such as U Ba Khin, Mother Sayamagyi, S. N. Goenka, Mahasi Sayadaw, and many others, spread the teachings to the West.

== Works ==
- A Manual of the Dhamma (Dhamma Dīpanī)
- Purification of the Sāsana (Sāsana Visodhanī)
- Manual of Firm or Strong Volitional Action (Daḷhi Kamma Dīpanī Nissaya)
- Recitation for Refuge (The Wheel of Paritta of 28 Buddhas)
- The Great Honour of Refuge or Protection (Mahāsaraṇa Guṇa)
- Manual of the Heritage of Buddhist Teaching (Sāsana Dāyajja Dīpanī)
- Manual of Diseases (Rogantara Dīpanī)
- Manual of Cows and Intoxicants (Goṇasūra Dīpanī)
- Manual of Successful Attainment by Buddhist Teachings (Sāsana Sampatti Dīpanī)
- A Manual of Excellent Man (Uttamapurisa Dīpanī)
- A Manual of Light and The Manual of the Path to Higher Knowledge: Two Expositions of the Buddha’s Teaching
- The Requisites of Enlightenment
- Manual of Insight (Vipassanā Dīpanī)
- Manual of Conditional Relations (Patthanuddesa Dīpanī)
- Manual of Right Views (Vipassanā Dīpanī)
- Manual of the Four Noble Truths (Catusacca Dīpanī)
- Manual of the Factors of Enlightenment (Bodhipakkhiya Dīpanī)
- Manual of the Constituents of the Path (Magganga Dīpanī)
- Manual of Mindfulness of Breathing (Anapana Dīpanī)
- Five Kinds of Light (Alin Kyan)
- 5 Questions on Kamma; Anattanisamsā
- Noble Eightfold Path and Its Factors
- Buddhist Philosophy of Relations
