= International Meditation Centre =

Buddhist organisation

- Established: November 9, 1952
- Founder: Sayagyi U Ba Khin
- Method: Ānāpāna & Vipassanā
- Affiliations: Theravāda Buddhism
- Website: http://www.ubakhin-vipassana-meditation.org/
- Motto: Truth Must Triumph; Principle: Talk Less and Work More; Aim: Nibbānic Peace Within

The International Meditation Centre (IMC) was founded by Sayagyi U Ba Khin (the first Accountant General of the Union of Burma) to promote the practice of Theravāda Buddhist vipassanā meditation. The first International Meditation Centre was opened in Rangoon (Yangon), Burma (Myanmar) in 1952, and since then five more centres were established in the UK, Western Australia, Maryland (USA), New South Wales (Australia) and Karinthia (Austria). In addition there are local groups from all over the world practising this meditation tradition today. (Note: IMC Contacts)

== Background ==
The Venerable Webu Sayadaw, who is reputed to be an arahant in Burma, encouraged U Ba Khin to teach the Buddha-Dhamma when they first met in 1941. This exhortation was later endorsed by his own meditation teacher Saya Thetgyi. U Ba Khin wanted to devise a meditation course with instructions that would give busy householders a taste of the Dhamma with the limited free time available to them. For this, he undertook research and experiments in vipassanā meditation, and drew upon the research and experiences of his own teacher, Saya Thetgyi (who had mainly taught laypeople). He was absolutely scrupulous in ensuring that whatever he taught should conform strictly with the original teachings of the Buddha in the Tipiṭaka; and also in accordance with several widely accepted commentaries, in particular The Path of Purification (Visuddhimagga). U Ba Khin submitted his research and results from his experiments to a number of venerable Sayadaws for their review and amendment. (Note: At one point, U Ba Khin compiled his results in a treatise entitled The Basic Study of the Buddha’s Teachings and Their Correct Application and wrote “I would like to invite pertinent criticism and comments, from those who are well matured in the field of paṭipatti [meditation] and from those Noble Ones who follow the teachings worthy of attention and [who] have practised extensively in the past and are practising diligently now”.) Among those who reviewed his results and gave their official approval were Masoeyain Sayadaw (President of the Sixth Buddhist Council), Veluwun Sayadaw of Bahan (President of the Hill Tracts Buddhist Mission), Hnit Kyait Shitsu Sayadaw of Thayettaw Taik (President of the Tipiṭakadhara Exams Board and President of the All Myanmar Mahā-Saṅgha Abbots Association, Yangon) and Webu Sayadaw.

== Early history ==
In 1950 the government of the Union of Burma issued an official circular stating that all civil service departments had the option of forming Buddhist associations for the purpose of religious activities. This resulted in the establishment of the Vipassanā Association of the Accountant General's Office in which U Ba Khin was elected president. U Ba Khin then started offering ten-day meditation courses to any staff in the Accountant General's Office who was interested to learn from him. As the number of meditators grew, it was soon apparent that the facilities in the Accountant General's Office were inadequate and U Ba Khin decided to establish a separate meditation centre in the vicinity of downtown Rangoon. At that time, U Ba Khin had already attracted the attention of a number of Westerners through a series of lectures he gave in 1951 at the English Methodist Church in Rangoon. (Note: These lectures were later published by the Vipassanā Research Association under the title What Buddhism Is, a booklet that was widely circulated throughout the world and excerpts from which were eventually translated into French and German.) Many Westerners became interested to learn Buddhism after listening to these lectures. Since U Ba Khin was the only English-speaking teacher of vipassanā in the country, he decided to name the new centre International to give foreigners a chance to experience the practical aspects of Buddhism. (Note: When the Sixth Buddhist Council was held in Rangoon, foreigners attending the Council often had questions about the teachings or about the practical side of Buddhism. As most of the bhikkhus at the event did not speak fluent English, they often referred these foreigners to U Ba Khin.) On 9 November 1952, the International Meditation Centre was officiated with the dedication of the Dhamma Yaung Chi Ceti (Light of the Dhamma) pagoda.

Within the first decade of its establishment there were many prominent individuals who took meditation courses at the IMC, including Sao Shwe Thaik (the first president of the Union of Burma), (Note: Ms. Marion Dix created a documentary entitled Life in Burma, which included a video clip featuring IMC Rangoon. This video which was shot in September 1957 contained a short video clip with Sao Shwe Thaik at the IMC. (Note: Youtube: IMC 1957)) U Lun Baw (Deputy Prime Minister of Burma), U San Nyun (Minister for Marine & Transport of Burma), (Note: BBC Television broadcast a documentary series in 1954 entitled Men Seeking God. (Note: Men Seeking God: Synopsis) The second episode of this documentary series talks about Buddhism and featured U San Nyun with a short video clip of the IMC (Note: Youtube: Men Seeking God: 2 - Buddhism, BBC Television)) U Bo Byi (Supreme Court Judge of Burma); and distinguished foreigners like His Excellency Mr. Eliashv Ben-Horin (Ambassador Extraordinary and Plenipotentiary for Israel, Burma), Mr. Anthony Brooke (Rajah Muda of Sarawak), Dr. Huston C. Smith (Professor of Philosophy, Massachusetts Institute of Technology), Dr. Padmanabh Jaini (Professor of Buddhist studies at UC Berkeley) and Dr. Leon E. Wright (Distinguished Professor of Religion, Howard University, Washington, D.C.). They have written short notes about their meditation experience at the IMC.

== The spread worldwide ==
In the 1960s, U Ba Khin's reputation as a meditation teacher spread abroad by word of mouth of his foreign students. He started receiving invitations to teach meditation in India, the United States, the Netherlands, Germany, England, and Canada. There was also a plot of land in Hawaii that was donated for the establishment of a meditation centre. However, travel restrictions by the Burmese government had made it impossible for him to travel. By the 1970s, there was an increasing number of foreigners who came to take courses at IMC Rangoon. However, the new restrictions meant that foreigners could only get seven-day visas to Burma. In order to meditate longer, some foreign students had to make a series of back-to-back seven-day trips into Rangoon, flying back and forth to Bangkok or Calcutta. This was not only expensive, but also affected the students’ progress in meditation. Mother Sayamagyi who succeeded Sayagyi U Ba Khin at the IMC after his demise, began to entertain the idea of travelling outside of Burma to teach meditation. In 1978, after a group of foreign students at the IMC made a firm determination (adhiṭṭhāna) to establish a permanent meditation centre in the West, Mother Sayamagyi started travelling abroad to teach the Dhamma. Since then she had established meditation centres throughout the world; including 5 centres with the Dhamma Yaung Chi Ceti pagoda. At present, all the meditation centres have regional teachers who were authorized by Mother Sayamagyi to conduct meditation courses.

== The meditation practice ==
The meditation course taught at the IMC is the practice of the Noble Eightfold Path, which is divided into the threefold training (sikkhā) of higher morality (sīla), higher concentration (samādhi) and higher wisdom (paññā). For morality, the students will keep at least the five precepts so as to develop purity of physical and verbal conduct. During the retreat, two types of meditation are taught: calmness and control of the mind through ānāpāna meditation (to develop samādhi); followed by vipassanā (insight) meditation which leads to wisdom into the true nature of reality. The entire practice is a gradual process of mental purification, leading to the end of suffering and the realisation of full enlightenment (Nibbāna). During the course, the teaching is done through personal experience: If what the student experiences is for his well-being, he can accept it; if it is not for his well-being, he need not accept it.

=== Ānāpāna meditation (mindfulness of breathing) ===
The student is first helped to develop calmness and concentration by focusing his attention on a spot where the breath touches at the base of the nose, mindfully aware of each in-breath and out-breath. When the mind is given only one object, it slowly becomes calm and steady. Gradually the breath becomes more and more subtle and the attention settles down on a small point of light and warmth. At this point, the mind becomes equanimous, clear and one-pointed (cittass’ekaggatā).

=== Vipassanā (Insight) meditation ===
After the mind has been brought to a state of one-pointedness and equanimity, the student then focuses his attention into himself and examines the inherent tendencies of everything that exists within his own self. Through introspective meditation, the student:
- becomes aware of the mental and bodily components in the process of change (anicca).
- experiences the process of change as unsatisfactory (dukkha).
- perceives the illusory nature of a permanent self (anattā).
This realization will progressively lead to detachment from the physical and mental phenomena that are experienced as constantly changing. It will gradually free the meditator from reactions such as craving and anger. It will give that peace within which will satisfy him; and help him not only to go beyond the day-to-day troubles of life, but slowly and surely beyond the limitations of life, suffering and death. (Note: IMC Meditation Practice)

== See also ==
- Sayagyi U Ba Khin
- Mother Sayamagyi

== Sources ==
=== Printed sources ===
- King, Dr. Winston L. (1964). A Thousand Lives Away: Buddhism in Contemporary Burma (PDF). Cambridge, Mass.: Harvard University Press.
- Mayhew, Christopher (1954). Excerpts from Men Seeking God (PDF). BBC Television.
- Nottingham, Dr. Elizabeth K. (1961). Introduction to the International Meditation Centre with Buddhist Meditation in Burma (PDF). 31A, Inyamyaing, Rangoon, Burma: Vipassana Association.
- Stuart, Daniel M. (2020). S. N. Goenka: Emissary of Insight. Boulder, CO: Shambhala Publications. ISBN 9781611808186.
- Truth Must Triumph (1 ed.). Heddington UK: The International Meditation Centres In the Tradition of Sayagyi U Ba Khin. 1999.
- The Anecdotes of Sayaygi U Ba Khin. Trowbridge, Wiltshire, UK: The Sayagyi U Ba Khin Memorial Trust, U.K. 1999.
- U Ba Khin (1991). U Chit Tin (ed.). Dhamma Text By Sayagyi U Ba Khin (PDF). Heddington UK: The International Meditation Centres In the Tradition of Sayagyi U Ba Khin.
- The Way to Ultimate Calm: Selected Discourses of Venerable Webu Sayadaw. Kandy, Sri Lanka: Buddhist Publication Society. 2007. ISBN 978-955-24-0218-0.
- The Light of the Dhamma (Vol. IX, No. 4 ed.). Rangoon, Union of Burma: Union of Burma Buddha Sasana Council. 1963.
