= Pariyatti, paṭipatti, paṭivedha =

Buddhist cultivation stages

In Theravāda Buddhism, pariyatti, paṭipatti, paṭivedha (Pāli; "Learning; practicing; realizing") is the educational concept consisting of three progressive stages culminating in full understanding of the Buddha's teaching. Pariyatti refers to the theoretical study of the Buddha's teaching as preserved within the suttas and commentaries of the Pāli Canon; paṭipatti means to put the theory into practice; and paṭivedha means penetrating the theory or rather experientially realizing the truth of it, that is the attainment of the four stages of awakening. Traditionally, pariyatti serves as the foundation of paṭipatti, and paṭipatti serves as the foundation of paṭivedha.

The Pāli Canon is the most complete Buddhist canon surviving in a classical Indian language, Pāli, which serves as the school's sacred language and lingua franca. In contrast to Mahāyāna and Vajrayāna, Theravāda tends to be conservative in matters of the theoretical study (pariyatti) of the doctrine (Dhamma) and monastic discipline (Vinaya). One element of this conservatism is the fact that Theravāda rejects the authenticity of the Mahayana sutras (which appeared c. 1st century BCE onwards).

== Overview ==
According to U Ba Khin, pariyatti is the teaching of the Buddha, the arahats (fully awakened beings) and the ariyas (persons who have tasted Nibbana), who have really and in detail understood the Four Noble Truths and teach what they themselves know to be true, what they have seen to be true and real from their own experience. At times, when it is not possible to find noble people such as a Buddha, arahats or ariyas to revere and rely on, one will have to establish as one's teacher the teachings of the Buddha contained in the 84,000 sections of the scriptures. One has to practise (paṭipatti) these teachings which lead to paṭivedha, that is the path (magga) and fruition (phala) states and Nibbana.

U Ba Khin states, "When one meets with a Buddha, arahats and noble ariyas, it is truly possible to practise morality, concentration and insight and attain the paths and fruits of awakening by merely listening to and following their teachings, which are given based on firsthand personal experience and knowledge."

“	Tattha pariyattīti tīṇi piṭakāni. Paṭivedhoti saccappaṭivedho. Paṭipattīti paṭipadā. … Sāsanaṭṭhitiyā pana pariyatti pamāṇaṃ. Herein, pariyatti is the Three Piṭakas. Paṭivedha is the penetration [of the Four Noble Truths]. Paṭipatti is the practice/path. … For the endurance of the sāsana (the Buddha's dispensation), the measure is pariyatti.	”

== Dhammānudhamma-paṭipatti ==
In the Pali Canon, the Buddha states that any monk, nun, male lay follower, or female lay follower who practices in line with the Dhamma (dhammānudhammappaṭipanna) "honor, respect, revere, venerate, and esteem the Buddha with the highest honor." This kind of honour (puja) is primarily an "internal worship" for inner development (citta, bhāvanā, and samādhi).

“	Any monk or nun or male or female lay follower who practices in line with the teaching, practicing properly, living in line with the teaching—they honor, respect, revere, venerate, and esteem the Realized One with the highest honor.	”
— Mahāparinibbāna Sutta, DN 16

Honor by practices (paṭipatti-pūjā), or non-material honour, can be done by developing the practices of:

- giving (dāna) or generosity (cāga)
- ethical conduct (sīla)
- concentration (samādhi)
- wisdom (paññā)

In the practice of prostration, one can find the chanting verse "Paṭipattiyā Ratanattayapaṇāma" chanted before each of the three prostrations:

First Prostration
Imāya dhammānudhamma-paṭipattiyā,

Buddhaṁ pūjemi.

By practicing the Dhamma in accordance with the Dhamma,

I venerate the Buddha.

Second Prostration
Imāya dhammānudhamma-paṭipattiyā,

Dhammaṁ pūjemi.

By practicing the Dhamma in accordance with the Dhamma,

I venerate the Dhamma.

Third Prostration
Imāya dhammānudhamma-paṭipattiyā,

Saṅghaṁ pūjemi.

By practicing the Dhamma in accordance with the Dhamma,

I venerate the Sangha.

== See also ==
- Threefold Training
- Gradual training
- Gradual instruction

== Bibliography ==
- Khantipalo, Bhikkhu (1982). Lay Buddhist Practice: The Shrine Room, Uposatha Day, Rains Residence (The Wheel No. 206/207). Kandy, Sri Lanka: Buddhist Publication Society. Retrieved 2007-10-22 from "Access to Insight" (transcribed 1995) at http://www.accesstoinsight.org/lib/authors/khantipalo/wheel206.html.
- Lee Dhammadharo, Ajaan & Thanissaro Bhikkhu (translator) (1998). Visakha Puja. Retrieved 2007-10-22 from "Access to Insight" at http://www.accesstoinsight.org/lib/thai/lee/visakha.html.
