= Gradual training =

Form of Buddhist training

The Buddha sometimes described the practice of his teaching as a gradual training (Pali: anupubbasikkhā), gradual performance (anupubbakiriyā), and gradual progression (anupubbapatipadā) because the Noble Eightfold Path involves a process of mind-body transformation that unfolds over a prolonged period rather than through an abrupt attainment of final knowledge.

“	Just as the ocean has a gradual shelf, a gradual slope, a gradual inclination, with a sudden drop-off only after a long stretch, in the same way this Dhamma-Vinaya has a gradual training (anupubbasikkhā), a gradual performance (anupubbakiriyā), a gradual progression (anupubbapatipadā), with a penetration to gnosis only after a long stretch.	”
— Uposatha Sutta, Ud 5.5

The emphasis on gradual training reflects the understanding that just as unwholesome behavioral patterns and mental defilements have been accumulated over a long duration, undoing them requires sustained, step-by-step commitment to mental culture.

== Sequence of training ==
In discourses such as the Gaṇakamoggallāna Sutta (MN 107), Cūḷahatthipadopama Sutta (MN 27), and Sāmaññaphala Sutta (DN 2), the Buddha details the gradual training as a progressive sequence of steps undertaken by a practitioner:

1. Virtue (sīlasampadā): Adhering to fundamental ethical precepts and maintaining purity in bodily and verbal conduct.
2. Sense restraint (indriyasaṁvara): Guarding the six sense doors (eyes, ears, nose, tongue, body, and mind) to prevent attraction and aversion toward sense objects.
3. Moderation in eating (bhojane mattaññutā): Consuming food mindfully, solely for maintaining physical health and sustaining the spiritual life.
4. Wakefulness (jāgariyānuyoga): Cleansing the mind of obstructive qualities through meditation during the day and night.
5. Mindfulness and clear comprehension (satisampajañña): Maintaining awareness and situational clarity in all physical activities and movements.
6. Seclusion (vivitta-senāsana): Resorting to a quiet, isolated dwelling such as a forest, the foot of a tree, or a mountain cave.
7. Abandoning the hindrances (nīvaraṇappahāna): Overcoming sensual desire, ill will, sloth and torpor, restlessness and worry, and doubt.
8. Meditative absorptions (jhāna): Attaining and dwelling in the four progressive stages of concentration.
9. Penetration to knowledge (aññāpaṭivedha): Developing insight that leads to the total destruction of mental taints (āsava) and the realization of Nirvana.

Each stage serves as a prerequisite foundation for the subsequent step, moving systematically from external behavioral discipline to internal mental stabilization and ultimate liberation.

== See also ==
- Gradual instruction
- Threefold Training
- Pariyatti, paṭipatti, paṭivedha

== Bibliography ==
- Bullitt, John T. (2005). "Dhamma". Access to Insight.
- Ñāṇamoli, Bhikkhu; Bodhi, Bhikkhu (2001). The Middle-Length Discourses of the Buddha: A Translation of the Majjhima Nikāya. Boston: Wisdom Publications. ISBN 0-86171-072-X.
- Nyanatiloka (1980). Buddhist Dictionary: Manual of Buddhist Terms and Doctrines. Kandy, Sri Lanka: Buddhist Publication Society. ISBN 955-24-0019-8.
- Thanissaro Bhikkhu (1998). "Kutthi Sutta: The Leper (Ud. 5.3)". Access to Insight.
- Walshe, Maurice (1995). The Long Discourses of the Buddha: A Translation of the Dīgha Nikāya. Boston: Wisdom Publications. ISBN 0-86171-103-3.
