= Mya Thwin =

- မြသွင်
- Title: Mahā Saddhamma Jotika Dhaja

Personal life
- Born: Mya Thwin; 12 March 1925 Moulmein, British Burma
- Died: 28 January 2017 (aged 91) IMC UK, Heddington, UK
- Other name: Mother Sayamagyi

Religious life
- Religion: Buddhism
- School: Theravada
- Lineage: Ledi Sayadaw

Senior posting
- Teacher: Sayagyi U Ba Khin
- Based in: International Meditation Centre

Daw Mya Thwin, known as Mother Sayamagyi (Burmese: မြသွင်, pronounced [mja̰ θwɪ̀ɰ̃]; 12 March 1925 – 28 January 2017) was a Theravada Buddhist meditation teacher who established centres for vipassana meditation around the world. She was a senior disciple of Sayagyi U Ba Khin, a vipassana master, and fulfilled his aspiration to teach Buddhist meditation in the West. (Note: Global IMC Teachers)

== Life and works ==
Mya Thwin was born on 12 March 1925 in Moulmein, British Burma. She grew up with her grandparents as her mother died in childbirth. Through her marriage to U Chit Tin she came into contact with Sayagyi U Ba Khin when her husband was transferred to the Accountant General's Office in Rangoon. Mya Thwin took her first course in 1953 at the International Meditation Centre (IMC) founded by Sayagyi U Ba Khin to teach meditation to his office staff. As her progress was very rapid, Sayagyi U Ba Khin visited her and her husband every day after the course and continued to teach her. In May of the same year, in a second 10-day course, she completed her training. Sayagyi U Ba Khin then invited the Venerable Webu Sayadaw to the IMC to confirm or correct his teaching. The Webu Sayadaw expressed his approval of Mya Thwin's penetration of the Buddha Dhamma by saying Sadhu three times after meeting her. (Note: Webu Sayadaw and Sayagyi U Ba Khin)

After this Mya Thwin was always with Sayagyi U Ba Khin when he taught students, both foreigners and Burmese. She became Sayagyi U Ba Khin's foremost disciple and co-teacher at the IMC. (Note: Profile from IMC UK) When the first president of independent Burma Sao Shwe Thaik came to the IMC, she helped him greatly in his progress. He told Sayagyi U Ba Khin: "Ma Mya Thwin is not an ordinary disciple", and he started to address her with the title "Sayama" (Lady teacher) and would pay respects to her before and after he meditated, a very unusual thing to do for such a senior person towards a young lady. Sayagyi U Ba Khin approved of this and also started addressing her as "Sayama". Later the deputy prime minister U Lun Baw, also a devoted meditation student of the IMC, addressed her as "Mother" though she was much younger than him. Later her students addressed her as "Mother Sayamagyi".

After Sayagyi U Ba Khin's death in 1971, Mya Thwin was requested by the president of the Vipassana Association of the Accountant General's Office, U Tint Yee, to take over the responsibility for the centre. She agreed and continued to teach there with the help of her husband U Chit Tin. On request of foreign students who came in increasing numbers, she agreed to travel abroad to teach Vipassana meditation. She and her husband left Burma in October 1978 to fulfill their teacher Sayagyi U Ba Khin's aspiration to make the teachings of the Buddha available in the West.

She did not speak English and her life abroad became possible because of the help from Roger Bichoff who learned Burmese only to be able to speak to her after he met her once in India.

Travelling and teaching for over 30 years, Mya Thwin established centres throughout the world, including five centres with pagodas for meditation: United Kingdom in 1979, Western Australia in 1981, United States (Maryland) in 1988, New South Wales (near Sydney) in 1989, and Austria (in Karinthia) in 1990. All the centres outside Myanmar have regional teachers who were authorized by Mother Sayamagyi to conduct meditation courses. (Note: IMC Contacts) All the five centres have Dhamma Yaungchi Pagodas, which are replicas of the pagoda at the IMC Yangon. She taught over 450 ten-day meditation courses for thousands of people during her travels in Asia, Australia, the Americas and Europe She also held over 20 Bhikkhu ordinations for those of her students who wanted to experience the advantages of meditating in robes, the garb of the Buddhas.

In March 1994, the Burmese government awarded Mya Thwin the title of Mahā-Sadhamma-Jotika Dhaja, the highest religious title that can be given to a lay person for her outstanding achievements in teaching the Buddha-Dhamma outside Myanmar.

She died on Saturday 28 January 2017.

== See also ==
- Sayagyi U Ba Khin
- Webu Sayadaw
- International Meditation Centre

== Sources ==
=== Printed sources ===
- Storti, Craig (2007). Art of Crossing Culture. Nicholas Brealey. ISBN 9781931930536.
- Stuart, Daniel M. (2020). S. N. Goenka: Emissary of Insight. Boulder, CO: Shambhala Publications. ISBN 9781611808186.
- Knowing Anicca and The Way to Nibbana (1 ed.). Heddington UK: Sayagyi U Ba Khin Memorial Trust, U.K. 1989.
- Truth Must Triumph (1 ed.). Heddington UK: The International Meditation Centres In the Tradition of Sayagyi U Ba Khin. 1999.
- The Anecdotes of Sayaygi U Ba Khin. Trowbridge, Wiltshire, UK: The Sayagyi U Ba Khin Memorial Trust, U.K. 1999.
- The Way to Ultimate Calm: Selected Discourses of Venerable Webu Sayadaw. Kandy, Sri Lanka: Buddhist Publication Society. 2007. ISBN 978-955-24-0218-0.
- Tuttle, Charles E. (1997). The Buddhist Directory: United States of America & Canada. ISBN 9780804831185.
