= Anupubbikathā =

Method of teaching used by the Buddha

In Theravada Buddhism, anupubbikathā or ānupubbikathā (Pali) – variously translated as "gradual discourse," "gradual instruction," "progressive instruction," and "step-by-step talk" – is a method by which the Buddha taught the Dhamma to suitably receptive lay people. In this approach, the Four Noble Truths are the consummate teaching. The common formula is:

1. Generosity (dāna)
2. Virtue (sīla)
3. Heaven (sagga)
4. Danger of sensual pleasure (kāmānaṃ ādīnava)
5. Renunciation (nekkhamma)
6. The Four Noble Truths (cattāri ariya-saccāni)

== From the Pali Canon ==
In the Pali Canon, the title for this training, its general intent and outline are provided in the following narrative formula (in English and Pali) which is found in multiple discourses:

"Then the Blessed One gave the householder ... progressive instruction, that is, talk on giving, talk on virtue, talk on the heavens; he explained the danger, degradation, and defilement in sensual pleasures and the blessing of renunciation. When he knew that the householder['s] ... mind was ready, receptive, free from hindrances, elated, and confident, he expounded to him the teaching special to the Buddhas: suffering, its origin, its cessation, and the path."

Atha kho bhagavā ... gahapatissa ānupubbīkathaṃ kathesi. Seyyathīdaṃ: dānakathaṃ, sīlakathaṃ, saggakathaṃ, kāmānaṃ ādīnavaṃ, okāraṃ saṅkilesaṃ, nekkhamme ānisaṃsaṃ pakāsesi. Yadā bhagavā aññāsi ... gahapatiṃ kallacittaṃ muducittaṃ vinīvaraṇacittaṃ udaggacittaṃ pasannacittaṃ, atha yā buddhānaṃ sāmukkaṃsikā dhammadesanā, taṃ pakāsesi: dukkhaṃ samudayaṃ nirodhaṃ maggaṃ.

Details for this training are provided in DN 2 and, to a lesser degree, in MN 27 and MN 51.

== See also ==
- Gradual training
- Four Noble Truths
- Noble Eightfold Path
- Dīghajāṇu Sutta (AN 8.54)
- Mangala Sutta (Sn 2.4)
- Samaññaphala Sutta (DN 2)
- Threefold Training
- Pariyatti, paṭipatti, paṭivedha
- Buddhist Paths to liberation

== Bibliography ==
- Bodhi, Bhikkhu (2005). In the Buddha's Words: An Anthology of Discourses from the Pali Canon. Boston: Wisdom Publications. ISBN 0-86171-491-1.
- Bullitt, John T. (2005). Dhamma. Retrieved 2007-11-08 from "Access to Insight" at https://www.accesstoinsight.org/ptf/dhamma/index.html.
- La Trobe University (n.d.), "Pali Canon Online Database," online search engine of the Sri Lanka Tripitaka Project's (SLTP) Pali Canon. Retrieved 2007-11-12 at https://web.archive.org/web/20070927001234/http://www.chaf.lib.latrobe.edu.au/dcd/pali.htm.
- Ñāṇamoli, Bhikkhu (trans.) & Bodhi, Bhikkhu (ed.) (2001). The Middle-Length Discourses of the Buddha: A Translation of the Majjhima Nikāya. Boston: Wisdom Publications. ISBN 0-86171-072-X.
- Nyanatiloka (1980). Buddhist Dictionary: Manual of Buddhist Terms and Doctrines. Kandy, Sri Lanka: Buddhist Publication Society. ISBN 955-24-0019-8. Retrieved 2007-11-10 from "BuddhaSasana" at http://www.budsas.org/ebud/bud-dict/dic_idx.htm.
- Rhys Davids, T.W. & William Stede (eds.) (1921–25). The Pali Text Society’s Pali–English Dictionary. Chipstead: Pali Text Society. A general on-line search engine for the PED is available at https://dsal.uchicago.edu/dictionaries/pali/.
- Thanissaro Bhikkhu (trans.) (1997). Samaññaphala Sutta: The Fruits of the Contemplative Life (DN 2). Retrieved 2007-11-11 from "Access to Insight" at https://www.accesstoinsight.org/tipitaka/dn/dn.02.0.than.html.
- Thanissaro, Bhikkhu (trans.) (1998). Kutthi Sutta: The Leper (Ud. 5.3). Retrieved 2007-11-12 from "Access to Insight" at https://www.accesstoinsight.org/tipitaka/kn/ud/ud.5.03.than.html.
- Walshe, Maurice (1995). The Long Discourses of the Buddha: A Translation of the Dīgha Nikāya. Boston: Wisdom Publications. ISBN 0-86171-103-3.
