= Webu Sayadaw =

Burmese Buddhist monk (1896–1977)

- ဝေဘူ ဆရာတော်
- Title: Sayadaw

Personal life
- Born: 17 February 1896 Ingyinpin, British Burma
- Died: 26 June 1977 (aged 81) Ingyinpin, Sagaing Division, Myanmar
- Occupation: Buddhist monk

Religious life
- Religion: Buddhism
- School: Theravada
- Monastic name: Kumāra

Senior posting
- Based in: Webu Monastery

Webu Sayadaw (Burmese: ဝေဘူ ဆရာတော်, pronounced [wèbù sʰəjàdɔ̀]; 17 February 1896 – 26 June 1977) was a Theravada Buddhist monk, and vipassanā master, best known for giving all importance to diligent practice, rather than scholastic achievement.

== Early life ==
Ven. Webu Sayadaw was born to Daw Kyin Nu and U Lu Pe in 1896 in British Burma near Khin U township in modern-day Sagaing Division. He underwent the usual monk's training in the Pāli scriptures from the age of nine, when he became a novice, until he was twenty-seven. His monastic name was Kumārakassapa.

== Monk and teacher ==
In 1923 (seven years after his ordination), he left the monastery and spent four years in solitude. He practiced (and later taught) the technique of Ānāpānasati (awareness of the in-breath and out-breath). He said that by working with this practice to a very deep level of concentration, one is able to develop Vipassanā (insight) into the essential characteristics of all experience: anicca (impermanence), anatta (egolessness) and dukkha (unsatisfactoriness). According to Roger Bischof, on return from his four years of seclusion, he said, regarding Ānāpānasati: "This is a shortcut to Nibbana, anyone can use it. It stands up to investigation and is in accordance with the teachings of the Buddha as conserved in the scriptures. It is the straight path to Nibbana." Ven. Webu Sayadaw was famous for his unflagging diligence in meditation and for spending most of his time in solitude. He was reputed to be an arahant (fully enlightened one).

For the first fifty-seven years of his life, Ven. Webu Sayadaw stayed in upper Burma, dividing his time among three meditation centres in a small area. After his first trip to Rangoon in 1953 to visit the International Meditation Centre at the invitation of Sayagyi U Ba Khin, he included southern Burma in his travels, visiting there to teach and meditate from time to time. He also went on pilgrimage to India and Sri Lanka. Ven. Webu Sayadaw spent his final days at the meditation centre in the village where he was born. He died on 26 June 1977, at the age of eighty-one.

== See also ==
- Sayagyi U Ba Khin
- International Meditation Centre
