= Threefold Training =

Buddhist practices for higher virtue, mind, and wisdom

Translations of triśikṣā
- English: threefold training, three trainings, three disciplines
- Sanskrit: त्रिशिक्षा (triśikṣā)
- Pali: tisikkhā
- Chinese: 三学 (Pinyin: sān xué)
- Japanese: 三學 (Rōmaji: sangaku)
- Khmer: ត្រ័យសិក្ខា (UNGEGN: traisĕkkha)
- Korean: 삼학 (RR: samhak)
- Tagalog: trisikga
- Tibetan: ལྷག་པའི་བསླབ་པ་གསུམ། (Wylie: lhag-pa’i bslab-pa gsum)
- Thai: ไตรสิกขา (RTGS: traisikkha)
- Vietnamese: tam học

The Buddha identified the threefold training (Sanskrit: triśikṣā; Pali: tisikkhā; or simply śikṣā or sikkhā) as training in:

- higher virtue (Pali adhisīla-sikkhā, Skt. adhiśīlaśikṣa)
- higher mind (Pali adhicitta-sikkhā, Skt. samādhiśikṣa)
- higher wisdom (Pali adhipaññā-sikkhā, Skt. prajñāśikṣa)

== In the Pali Canon ==
According to Theravada canonical texts, pursuing this training leads to the abandonment of lust, hatred, and delusion. One who is fully accomplished in this training attains nirvana.

In the Anguttara Nikaya, training in "higher virtue" includes following the Patimokkha, training in "higher mind" (sometimes simply referred to as "concentration") includes entering and dwelling in the four jhanas, and training in "higher wisdom" includes directly perceiving the Four Noble Truths or knowledge of destruction of the taints.

In several canonical discourses, a more "gradual" instruction (anupubbikathā) is provided to receptive lay people (see also, gradual training). This latter instruction culminates in the teaching of the Four Noble Truths which in itself concludes with the Noble Eightfold Path, the constituents of which can be mapped to this threefold training (see below).

=== Similarity to threefold partition of the Noble Eightfold Path ===
The Buddha's threefold training is similar to the threefold grouping of the Noble Eightfold Path articulated by Bhikkhuni Dhammadinna in Culavedalla Sutta ("The Shorter Set of Questions-And-Answers Discourse," MN 44): virtue (sīlakkhandha), concentration (samādhikkhandha), wisdom (paññākkhandha ). These three-part schemes simplify and organize the Eightfold Path as follows:

Threefold Partition	Eightfold Path	Method of Practice
VIRTUE	Right Speech	Five Precepts
VIRTUE	Right Action	Five Precepts
VIRTUE	Right Livelihood	Five Precepts
MIND	Right Effort	Dwelling in the four jhanas (meditation)
MIND	Right Mindfulness	Dwelling in the four jhanas (meditation)
MIND	Right Concentration	Dwelling in the four jhanas (meditation)
WISDOM	Right View	Knowing Four Noble Truths
WISDOM	Right Intention	Knowing Four Noble Truths

== Mahayana ==
The threefold training is also part of the bodhisattva path of the Mahayana. Nagarjuna refers to it in his Letter to a Friend (Suhrllekha), verse 53:

"One should always train (shiksha) in superior discipline (adhishila), superior wisdom (adhiprajna) and superior mind (adhicitta)"

== See also ==
- Gradual training
- Gradual instruction
- Pariyatti, paṭipatti, paṭivedha

== Sources ==
- Nyanaponika Thera and Bhikkhu Bodhi (trans. and ed.) (1999). Numerical Discourses of the Buddha: An Anthology of Suttas from the Anguttara Nikaya. Walnut Creek, CA: Altamira Press. ISBN 0-7425-0405-0.
- Thanissaro Bhikkhu (trans.) (1998a). AN 3.88: Sikkha Sutta - Trainings (1). Available on-line at http://www.accesstoinsight.org/tipitaka/an/an03/an03.088.than.html.
- Thanissaro Bhikkhu (trans.) (1998b). AN 3.89: Sikkha Sutta - Trainings (2). Available on-line at http://www.accesstoinsight.org/tipitaka/an/an03/an03.089.than.html.
- Thanissaro Bhikkhu (trans.) (1998c). MN 44: Culavedalla Sutta: The Shorter Set of Questions-and-Answers. Available on-line at http://www.accesstoinsight.org/tipitaka/mn/mn.044.than.html.
