= Sayagyi U Ba Khin =

Burmese civil servant and Vipassana meditation master

- ဘခင်
- Born: 6 March 1899; Yangon, Pegu Province, British Burma
- Died: 19 January 1971 (aged 71); Yangon, Yangon Division, Myanmar
- Occupation: Vipassanā meditation teacher / Accountant General
- Title: Sayagyi U

Sayagyi U Ba Khin (Burmese: ဘခင်, pronounced [ba̰ kʰɪ̀ɰ̃]; 6 March 1899 – 19 January 1971) was the first Accountant General of the Union of Burma. He was the founder of the International Meditation Centre in Yangon, Myanmar, and is principally known as a leading twentieth century authority on Vipassana meditation.

== Life and works ==
Ba Khin was born in Yangon during the British colonial rule on 6 March 1899. He attended St. Paul's High School and passed the final high school examination, winning a gold medal (for placing First in Burma) as well as a college scholarship. Family pressures forced him to discontinue his formal education to start earning money. His first job was with a Burmese newspaper called The Sun, but after some time he began working as an accounts clerk in the office of the Accountant General of Burma. In 1926 he passed the Accounts Service examination, given by the provincial government of India. In 1937, when Burma was separated from India, he was appointed the first Special Office Superintendent.

In that same year, in January 1937, Ba Khin met a student of Saya Thet Gyi. Thet Gyi was a wealthy farmer and disciple of the renowned master Ledi Sayadaw, who taught him anapana-sati, a form of meditation taught by the Buddha. When Ba Khin tried it, he experienced good concentration, which impressed him so much that he resolved to complete a full course in Vipassana meditation that Thet Gyi offered at a center he had established for that purpose. Accordingly, Ba Khin applied for a ten-day leave of absence and set out for Thet Gyi's teaching center. Ba Khin progressed well during this first ten-day course, and continued his practise during frequent visits to his teacher's center and meetings with Thet Gyi whenever he came to Rangoon.

In 1941, a seemingly happenstance incident occurred which was to be important in his life. While on government business in upper Burma, he met by chance Webu Sayadaw, a monk who was widely recognised as an arahant. Webu Sayadaw was impressed with Ba Khin's proficiency in meditation, and urged him to teach. The monk was the first person to exhort Ba Khin to start teaching.

On 4 January 1948, the day Burma gained independence, Ba Khin was appointed first Accountant General of the Union of Burma.

In 1950 he founded the Vipassana Association of the Accountant General's Office where lay people, mainly employees of that office, could learn Vipassana meditation. In 1952, the International Meditation Centre (I.M.C.) was opened in Rangoon, two miles north of the Shwedagon Pagoda. Here many Burmese and foreign students received instruction in the Dhamma from Ba Khin. He was also active in the planning for the Sixth Buddhist Council known as Chaṭṭha Saṅgāyana (Sixth Recitation) which was held in 1954–56 in Yangon. (Note: U Ba Khin was appointed Executive Member of the Union of Burma Buddha-Sasana Council (UBSC) where was made chairman of the Committee for Patipatti (Practical Buddhist Meditation), as well as the Honorary Auditor of the Sixth Buddhist Council)

Ba Khin finally retired from his career in government service in 1967. From that time, until his premature death in 1971 stemming from complications of surgery, he stayed at I.M.C. in Burma, teaching Vipassana.

== Legacy ==
Ba Khin became a notable teacher of vipassanā meditation. After his death, some of his students established meditation centers in his tradition in various countries.

There are six International Meditation Centres organised by the Burmese Buddhist branch of students in the Ba Khin Tradition. Each of these centres in the West is a direct offshoot of the International Meditation Centre of Rangoon, Burma, which was founded by Ba Khin. These centres are guided by his disciple Mya Thwin, known to her followers as Mother Sayamagyi.

Another student of Ba Khin is S. N. Goenka. There are over two hundred centres of Vipassana meditation as taught by S. N. Goenka in the tradition of Sayagyi U Ba Khin, located in various countries throughout the world.

== Worldwide influence ==
It was Ba Khin's wish that the technique, long lost in India, could again return to its country of origin, and from there, spread throughout the world. Ba Khin made a determined effort to travel to the West to teach Vipassana there. Due to travel restriction in place at that time, he was never able to personally fulfill his wish.

When he realised his time was running out, he commissioned the following foreign students and entrusted them with teaching Vipassana in their respective countries.

- Authorised by a letter dated April 23, 1969:

1. Dr Leon Wright, PhD., Professor of Religion, Washington, D.C., U.S.A.
2. Mr. Robert H. Hover, La Mirada, California, U.S.A.
3. Mrs. Ruth Denison, Hollywood, California, U.S.A. (to teach women only).
4. Mrs. Forella Landie, British Columbia, Canada (to teach women only).
5. Mr. John Earl Coleman, Maidenhead, Berks., U.K.
6. Mr. J. Van Amersfoort, The Hague, The Netherlands.

- Authorised separately on June 20, 1969, after being informally authorised in July 1967 when a ten-day meditation course was conducted for the Hindu community in Mandalay with guidance coming from Sayagyi in Rangoon:

7. Mr. S. N. Goenka, Bombay, India.

In Burma, the ten members of the Vipassana Research Association assisted Sayagyi in his teaching, and in particular, Mother Sayamagyi Daw Mya Thwin, U Chit Tin, U Tint Yee, U Ba Pho, and U Boon Shain.

== See also ==
- International Meditation Centre
- Webu Sayadaw
- Ledi Sayadaw
- Mother Sayamagyi

== Bibliography ==
- Jack Kornfield (1988). "13. U Ba Khin". Living Buddhist Masters. Buddhist Publication Society. pp. 241–244. ISBN 978-955-24-0042-1.
- Pierluigi Confalonieri, ed. (1999). The Clock of Vipassana Has Struck: a tribute to the saintly life and legacy of a lay master of Vipassana Meditation (First USA ed.). Seattle, USA: Vipassana Research Publications. ISBN 0-9649484-6-X.
- Truth Must Triumph (1 ed.). Heddington UK: The International Meditation Centres In the Tradition of Sayagyi U Ba Khin. 1999.
- Sayagyi U Ba Khin Journal: a collection commemorating the teaching of Sayagyi U Ba Khin (2nd ed.). Igatpuri, India: Vipassana Research Institute. 1998. ISBN 81-7414-016-6.
- The Way to Ultimate Calm: Selected Discourses of Venerable Webu Sayadaw. Kandy, Sri Lanka: Buddhist Publication Society. 2007. ISBN 978-955-24-0218-0.
- U Ba Khin (1991). U Chit Tin (ed.). Dhamma Text By Sayagyi U Ba Khin (PDF). Heddington UK: The International Meditation Centres In the Tradition of Sayagyi U Ba Khin.
- The Light of the Dhamma (Vol. IX, No. 4 ed.). Rangoon, Union of Burma: Union of Burma Buddha Sasana Council. 1963.
- Stuart, Daniel M. (2020). S. N. Goenka: Emissary of Insight. Boulder, CO: Shambhala Publications. pp. 38–76. ISBN 9781611808186.
- The Anecdotes of Sayaygi U Ba Khin. Trowbridge, Wiltshire, UK: The Sayagyi U Ba Khin Memorial Trust, U.K. 1999.
- Storti, Craig (2023). Noble Work: A Life of Sayagyi U Ba Khin. Heddington UK: The International Meditation Centres In the Tradition of Sayagyi U Ba Khin.
