= Samatha-vipassanā =

Buddhist meditation practices

Translations of Samatha
- English: calm, tranquility, serenity, calm abiding
- Sanskrit: शमथ (IAST: śamatha)
- Pali: samatha
- Burmese: သမထ
- Chinese: 止 (Pinyin: zhǐ)
- Indonesian: ketenangan
- Japanese: 止 (Rōmaji: shi)
- Khmer: សមថ
- Korean: 지 (止) (RR: ji)
- Sinhala: සමථ (samatha)
- Tibetan: ཞི་གནས་ (Wylie: zhi gnas; THL: shyiné)
- Thai: สมถะ
- Vietnamese: chỉ

Translations of Vipassanā
- English: insight, clear-seeing, special seeing, distinct seeing
- Sanskrit: विपश्यना (IAST: vipaśyanā)
- Pali: vipassanā
- Burmese: ဝိပဿနာ
- Chinese: 觀 (Pinyin: guān)
- Indonesian: pandangan terang
- Japanese: 観 (Rōmaji: kan)
- Khmer: វិបស្សនា (UNGEGN: vĭbâssânéa)
- Korean: 관 (觀) (RR: gwan)
- Sinhala: විදර්ශනා; විපස්සනා (vidarśanā; vipassanā)
- Tibetan: ལྷག་མཐོང་ (Wylie: lhag mthong; THL: lhak-thong)
- Thai: วิปัสสนา
- Vietnamese: minh sát, quán

Samatha (Note: Pāli: samatha; Sanskrit: śamatha शमथ; Chinese: 止; pinyin: zhǐ (Note: Also romanized to samatha; Tibetan: ཞི་གནས་, Wylie: zhi gnas, THL: shyiné; English: "calm" or "tranquility"); Sinhala: samatha සමථ) ("calm," "serenity," "tranquility of awareness") (Note: Anguttara Nikaya 4.94: Tatiyasamādhisutta, translation Thanissaro Bikkhu) and vipassanā (Note: Pāli: vipassanā; Sanskrit: vipaśyanā विपश्यना; Chinese: 觀; pinyin: guān; Sinhala: විදර්ශනා) (lit. 'special, super (vi-), seeing (-passanā)') are two qualities of the mind developed in tandem in Buddhist practice.

In the Pāli Canon and the Āgama these qualities are not specific practices, but elements of "a single path," and are "fulfilled" with the development (bhāvanā) of mindfulness (sati) and meditation (jhāna) and other path-factors. While jhāna has a central role in the Buddhist path, vipassanā is rarely mentioned separately, but is usually described along with samatha.

The Abhidhamma Pitaka and the commentaries describe samatha and vipassanā as two separate techniques, taking samatha to mean concentration-meditation, and vipassanā as a practice to gain insight. In the Theravāda tradition, vipassanā is a practice that seeks "insight into the true nature of reality", which is defined as anicca ("impermanence"), dukkha ("suffering, unsatisfactoriness"), and anattā ("non-self"): the three marks of existence. In the Mahayana traditions vipassanā is defined as insight into śūnyatā ("emptiness") and Buddha-nature.

In modern Theravāda, the relation between samatha and vipassanā is a matter of dispute. Meditation-practice was reinvented in the Theravāda tradition in the 18th–20th centuries, based on contemporary readings of the Satipaṭṭhāna sutta, the Visuddhimagga, and other texts, centering on vipassanā and "dry insight" and downplaying samatha. Vipassanā became of central importance in the 20th century Vipassanā movement which favors vipassanā over samatha.

Some critics point out that both are necessary elements of the Buddhist training, while other critics argue that dhyāna is not a single-pointed concentration exercise.

== Terminology ==
=== Samatha ===
The Sanskrit word śamatha can be translated as "tranquility"; "tranquility of the mind"; "tranquillity of awareness"; "serenity"; "calm"; "meditative calm"; or "quietude of the heart."

The Tibetan term for samatha is ཞི་གནས་ (shiné; Wylie: zhi-gnas). The semantic field of Sanskrit śama and Tibetan shi is "pacification", "the slowing or cooling down", "rest." The semantic field of Tibetan né is "to abide or remain" which is assumed to be the meaning of the final syllable of the Sanskrit, thā. According to Jamgon Kongtrul, the terms refer to "peace" and "pacification" of the mind and the thoughts.

=== Vipassanā ===
Vipassanā is a Pali word derived from the prefix "vi-" and the verbal root "-passanā":

vi-
"special," "super"; "in a special way," "into, through"; "clear."
-passanā
"seeing"; "seeing," "perceiving"; "free from preconception."

The literal meaning is "super-seeing," but is often translated as "insight" or "clear-seeing." Henepola Gunaratana defines vipassanā as "[l]ooking into something with clarity and precision, seeing each component as distinct and separate, and piercing all the way through so as to perceive the most fundamental reality of that thing." According to Mitchell Ginsberg, vipassanā is "[i]nsight into how things are, not how we thought them to be."

Associated with vipassanā is the Pāli term paccakkha (cognate to Sanskrit: pratyakṣa) "perceptible to the senses", literally "before the eyes", which refers to direct experiential perception. Thus, the type of seeing denoted by vipassanā is that of direct perception, as opposed to knowledge derived from reasoning or argument.

In Tibetan, vipassanā is lhaktong (Wylie: lhag mthong). Lhak means "higher", "superior", "greater"; tong is "view, to see". So together, lhaktong may be rendered into English as "superior seeing", "great vision", or "supreme wisdom". This may be interpreted as a "superior manner of seeing", and also as "seeing that which is the essential nature". Its nature is a lucidity—a clarity of mind.

== Origins and development ==
=== Early Buddhism ===
According to Thanissaro Bhikkhu, "samatha, jhāna, and vipassanā were all part of a single path." According to Keren Arbel, samatha and vipassanā are not specific practices, but qualities of the mind that a practitioner fulfills as they develop the factors of the Noble Eightfold Path, including sati ("mindfulness") and jhāna ("meditation"). In the Sutta Piṭaka the term "vipassanā" is hardly mentioned, while those texts frequently mention jhāna as the meditative practice to be undertaken. As Thanissaro Bhikkhu writes,

When [the Pāli suttas] depict the Buddha telling his disciples to go meditate, they never quote him as saying "go do vipassanā," but always "go do jhāna." And they never equate the word "vipassanā" with any mindfulness techniques. In the few instances where they do mention vipassanā, they almost always pair it with samatha — not as two alternative methods, but as two qualities of mind that a person may "gain" or "be endowed with," and that should be developed together.

According to Vetter and Bronkhorst, dhyāna constituted the original "liberating practice" of the Buddha. Vetter further argues that the Noble Eightfold Path constitutes a collection of practices that prepare one, and lead up to, the practice of dhyāna. Vetter and Bronkhorst further note that dhyāna is not limited to single-pointed concentration, which seems to be described in the first jhāna, but develops into equanimity and mindfulness, (Note: Original publication: Gombrich, Richard (2007), Religious Experience in Early Buddhism, OCHS Library, archived from the original on 2016-07-01) "born from samādhi." Wynne notes that one is then no longer absorbed in concentration, but is mindfully aware of objects while being indifferent to them, "directing states of meditative absorption towards the mindful awareness of objects."

A number of suttas mention samatha and vipassanā as mental qualities that are to be developed in tandem. (Note: See Tatiyasamādhisutta ("Four Kinds of Persons Sutta"), AN 4.94.: Bodhi, Bhikkhu (2005). In the Buddha's Words: An Anthology of Discourses from the Pali Canon, pp. 269–70, 440 n. 13. Wisdom Publications. ISBN 9780861714919. See also "Samadhi Sutta: Concentration (Tranquillity and Insight)". Translated by Thanissaro Bhikku. 1998d. Archived from the original on 2018-10-13.) In SN 43.2, the Buddha states: "And what, bhikkhus, is the path leading to the unconditioned? Serenity and insight..." In SN 35.245, the Kimsuka Tree Sutta, the Buddha provides an elaborate metaphor in which serenity and insight are "the swift pair of messengers" who deliver the message of nibbāna (Pāli; Skt.: nirvāṇa) via the noble eightfold path: (Note: Bodhi (2000), pp. 1251–53. See also "Kimsuka Sutta: The Riddle Tree". Translated by Thanissaro Bhikku. 1998. Archived from the original on 2019-09-01. (where this sutta is identified as SN 35.204))

These two qualities have a share in clear knowing. Which two? Tranquility (samatha) & insight (vipassanā).

When tranquility is developed, what purpose does it serve? The mind is developed. And when the mind is developed, what purpose does it serve? Passion is abandoned.
When insight is developed, what purpose does it serve? Discernment is developed. And when discernment is developed, what purpose does it serve? Ignorance is abandoned.

Defiled by passion, the mind is not released. Defiled by ignorance, discernment does not develop. Thus from the fading of passion is there awareness-release. From the fading of ignorance is there discernment-release.

Ven. Ānanda reports that people attain arahantship in one of four ways:

Friends, whoever — monk or nun — declares the attainment of arahantship in my presence, they all do it by means of one or another of four paths. Which four?
There is the case where a monk has developed insight preceded by tranquility. [...]
Then there is the case where a monk has developed tranquillity preceded by insight. [...]
Then there is the case where a monk has developed tranquillity in tandem with insight. [...]
Then there is the case where a monk's mind has its restlessness concerning the Dhamma [Comm: the corruptions of insight] well under control.

— AN 4.170, the Four Ways to Arahantship Sutta (Note: Bodhi (2005), pp. 268, 439 nn. 7, 9, 10. See also "Yuganaddha Sutta: In Tandem". AN 4.170. Translated by Thanissaro Bhikku. 1998f. Archived from the original on 2013-06-19.)

=== Disjunction of samatha and vipassanā ===
Buddhaghosa, in his influential Theravāda scholastic treatise Visuddhimagga, states that jhāna is induced by samatha, and then jhāna is reflected upon with mindfulness, becoming the object of vipassanā, with the reflector realizing that jhāna is marked by the three characteristics. One who uses this method is referred to as a "tranquility worker" (Pāḷi: samatha yānika). However, modern Buddhist teachers such as Henepola Gunaratana state that there is virtually no evidence of this method in the Pāḷi suttas. A few suttas describe a method of "bare insight", or "dry insight" where only vipassanā is practiced, examining ordinary physical and mental phenomena to discern the three marks. Gombrich and Brooks argue that the distinction as two separate paths originates in the earliest interpretations of the Sutta Pitaka, not in the suttas themselves. (Note: (Brooks 2006): "While many commentaries and translations of the Buddha's Discourses claim the Buddha taught two practice paths, one called 'shamata' and the other called 'vipassanā,' there is in fact no place in the suttas where one can definitively claim that.")

According to Richard Gombrich, a development took place in early Buddhism resulting in a change in doctrine that considered prajñā to be an alternative means to awakening, alongside the practice of meditation. The suttas contain traces of ancient debates between Mahāyāna and Theravāda schools concerning the interpretation of the teachings and the development of insight. Out of these debates developed the idea that bare insight suffices to reach liberation, by discerning the three marks (qualities) of (human) existence (tilakkhaṇa), namely dukkha (suffering), anattā (non-self), and anicca (impermanence). Thanissaro Bikkhu also argues that samatha and vipassanā have a "unified role," whereas "[t]he Abhidhamma and the Commentaries, by contrast, state that samatha and vipassanā are two distinct meditation paths." (Note: Thanissaro Bhikkhu: This description of the unified role of samatha and vipassanā is based upon the Buddha's meditation teachings as presented in the suttas (see "One Tool Among Many" by Thanissaro Bhikkhu). The Abhidhamma and the Commentaries, by contrast, state that samatha and vipassanā are two distinct meditation paths (see, for example, The Jhanas in Theravada Buddhist Meditation by H. Gunaratana, ch. 5).)

Gunaratana notes that "[t]he classical source for the distinction between the two vehicles of serenity and insight is the Visuddhimagga." Ajahn Brahm (who, like Bhikkhu Thanissaro, is of the Thai Forest Tradition) writes that

Some traditions speak of two types of meditation, insight meditation (vipassanā) and calm meditation (samatha). In fact the two are indivisible facets of the same process. Calm is the peaceful happiness born of meditation; insight is the clear understanding born of the same meditation. Calm leads to insight and insight leads to calm."

== Theravāda and the vipassanā movement ==
By the tenth century meditation was no longer practiced in the Theravada tradition, due to the belief that Buddhism had degenerated, and that liberation was no longer attainable until the coming of the future Buddha, Maitreya. (Note: (Sharf 1995, p. 241): "In fact, contrary to the image propagated by twentieth-century apologists, the actual practice of what we would call meditation rarely played a major role in Buddhist monastic life. The ubiquitous notion of mappo or the 'final degenerate age of the dharma' served to reinforce the notion that 'enlightenment' was not in fact a viable goal for monks living in inauspicious times.") It was reinvented in Myanmar (Burma) in the 18th century by Medawi (1728–1816), leading to the rise of the Vipassanā movement in the 20th century, reinventing vipassanā meditation, developing simplified meditation techniques (based on the Satipatthana sutta, the Ānāpānasati Sutta, the Visuddhimagga, and other texts), and emphasizing satipaṭṭhāna and bare insight. In this approach, samatha is regarded as a preparation for vipassanā, pacifying the mind and strengthening concentration, so that insight into impermanence can arise, which leads to liberation. Ultimately, these techniques aim at stream entry, which safeguards future development towards full awakening, despite the degenerated age we live in. (Note: (Fronsdal 1998, p. 2): "The primary purpose for which Mahasi offered his form of vipassanā practice is the attainment of the first of the four traditional Theravāda levels of sainthood (that is, stream entry; sotāpatti) through the realization of nibbāna, or enlightenment." (Sharf 1995, p. 256)"The initial 'taste' of nibbāna signals the attainment of sotapatti-the first of four levels of enlightenment-which renders the meditator a 'noble person' (ariya-puggala) destined for release from the wheel of existence (saṃsāra) in relatively short order.")

=== Samatha ===
According to the Theravāda tradition, samatha refers to techniques that help to calm the mind. Samatha is thought to be developed by samādhi, interpreted by the Theravāda commentatorial tradition as concentration-meditation, the ability to rest the attention on a single object of perception. One of the principal techniques for this purpose is mindfulness of breathing (Pāḷi: ānāpānasati). It is commonly interpreted that Samatha should necessarily be practiced as a prelude to and in conjunction with wisdom practices.

==== Objects of samatha-meditation ====
Some meditation practices, such as contemplation of a kasiṇa object, favor the development of samatha; others, such as contemplation of the aggregates, are conducive to the development of vipassanā; while others, such as mindfulness of breathing, are classically used for developing both mental qualities.

The Visuddhimagga (5th century CE) mentions forty objects of meditation. Mindfulness (sati) of breathing (ānāpāna: ānāpānasati; S. ānāpānasmṛti) is the most common samatha practice (though this term is also used for vipassanā meditation). Samatha can include other samādhi practices as well.

==== Signs and stages of joy in samatha-meditation ====
Theravāda Buddhism describes the development of samatha in terms of three successive mental images or 'signs' (nimitta) (Note: The three nimittas are the preparatory sign, the acquired sign and the counterpart sign. These are mental images of the meditation object, but are also understood as perceptions or sensations that arise in the course of practice. They indicate the level of refinement of the state of meditative awareness.) and five stages of joy (Pīti). (Note: Five stages of joy: 1. Slight joy (khuddaka piti) - Raises the hairs of the body; 2. Momentary joy (khanika piti) - Arises momentarily like repeated flashes of lightning; 3. Showering joy (okkantika piti)- Washes over the body, like waves, again and again and then subsides; 4. Uplifting joy (ubbega piti) - Sensations of lifting of the body into the air; 5. Suffusing joy (pharana piti) - Pervades the whole body touching every part - signals 'access concentration'.) According to the Theravāda-tradition, pīti, a feeling of joy, gladness or rapture, arises from the abandonment of the five hindrances in favor of concentration on a single object. These stages are outlined by the Theravāda exegete Buddhaghosa in his Visuddhimagga (also in Atthasālinī) and the earlier Upatissa (author of the Vimuttimagga). Following the establishment of access concentration (upacāra-samādhi), one can enter the four jhānas, powerful states of joyful absorption in which the entire body is pervaded with pīti.

==== Variations in samatha ====
In the Theravāda tradition various understandings of samatha exist: (Note: (Shankman 2008) comparatively surveys the treatment of samatha in the suttas, in the commentarial tradition of the Visuddhimagga, and among a number of prominent contemporary Theravāda teachers of various orientations.)

- In Sri Lanka samatha includes all those meditations that are directed at static objects.
- In Burma, samatha comprises all concentration practices aimed at calming the mind.
- The Thai Forest tradition deriving from Ajahn Mun and popularized by Ajahn Chah stresses the inseparability of samatha and vipassanā, and the essential necessity of both practices.

=== Vipassanā ===
In modern Theravāda, liberation is thought to be attained by insight into the transitory nature of phenomena. This is accomplished by establishing sati (mindfulness) and samatha through the practice of ānāpānasati (mindfulness of breathing), using mindfulness for observing the impermanence in the bodily and mental changes, to gain insight (P: vipassanā, S: vipaśyanā; P: paññā, S: prajñā) into the true nature of phenomena.Nina van Gorkom, on the development of insight (vipassanā), notes that “There is no self who experiences something. The seeing sees, the hearing hears, the thinking thinks.”

The term vipassanā is often conflated with the Vipassanā Movement, which popularised new vipassanā teachings and practice. It started in the 1950s in Burma, but has gained wide renown mainly through American Buddhist teachers such as Joseph Goldstein, Tara Brach, Gil Fronsdal, Sharon Salzberg, and Jack Kornfield. The movement has a wide appeal due to being inclusive of different Buddhist and non-buddhist wisdom, poetry as well as science. It has together with the modern American Zen tradition served as one of the main inspirations for the "mindfulness movement" as developed by Jon Kabat-Zinn and others. The Vipassanā Movement, also known as the Insight Meditation Movement, is rooted in Theravāda Buddhism and the revival of meditation techniques, especially the "New Burmese Method", the Thai Forest Tradition, and modern influences on the traditions of Sri Lanka, Burma, Laos, and Thailand.

In the Vipassanā Movement, the emphasis is on the Satipatthana Sutta and the use of mindfulness to gain insight into the impermanence of the self. It argues that the development of strong samatha can be disadvantageous, a stance for which the Vipassana Movement has been criticised, especially in Sri Lanka. The "New Burmese Method" was developed by U Nārada (1868–1955), and popularised by Mahasi Sayadaw (1904–1982) and Nyanaponika Thera (1901–1994). Other influential Burmese proponents include Ledi Sayadaw and Mogok Sayadaw as well as Mother Sayamagyi and S. N. Goenka, who were both students of Sayagyi U Ba Khin. Influential Thai teachers include Ajahn Chah and Buddhadasa. A well-known Indian teacher is Dipa Ma. Sujin Boriharnwanaket stresses the importance of natural development in the practice of insight (vipassanā). In A Survey of Paramattha Dhammas she notes that “Nobody can hasten the development of satipaṭṭhāna” and that unnatural effort or the desire to make understanding arise creates clinging and confusion, whereas natural investigation of the characteristics of realities that appear allows understanding to grow.

==== Stages of practice ====
Practice begins with the preparatory stage, the practice of śīla (virtue): giving up worldly thoughts and desires. Jeff Wilson notes that morality is a quintessential element of Buddhist practice, and is also emphasized by the first generation of post-war western teachers. However, in the contemporary mindfulness movement, morality as an element of practice has been mostly discarded, "mystifying" the origins of mindfulness.

The practitioner then engages in ānāpānasati (mindfulness of breathing), which is described in the Satipatthana Sutta as going into the forest and sitting beneath a tree to simply watch the breath: If the breath is long, to notice that the breath is long, if the breath is short, to notice that the breath is short. In the "New Burmese Method", the practitioner attends to any arising mental or physical phenomenon, engaging in vitarka, noting or naming physical and mental phenomena (e.g. "breathing, breathing"), without engaging the phenomenon with further conceptual thinking. By noticing the arising of physical and mental phenomena, the meditator becomes aware how sense impressions arise from the contact between the senses and physical and mental phenomena, as described in the five skandhas and paṭiccasamuppāda. According to Sayadaw U Pandita, one's awareness and observation of these sensations is de-coupled from any kind of physical response, which reconditions one's impulsive responses to stimuli, such that one is less likely to physically or emotionally overreact to the happenings of the world.

The practitioner also becomes aware of the incessant changes involved in breathing, and the arising and passing away of mindfulness. This noticing is accompanied by reflections on causation and other Buddhist teachings, leading to insight into dukkha, anattā, and anicca. When these three characteristics have been comprehended, reflection subdues, and the process of noticing accelerates, noting phenomena in general, without necessarily naming them.

According to Thai meditation master Ajahn Lee, the practice of both samatha and vipassanā together allows one to achieve various mental powers and gnosis (Pāḷi: abhiññā), including the attainment of nirvāṇa, whereas the practice of vipassanā alone allows for the achievement of nirvāṇa, but no other mental powers or gnosis.

==== Vipassanā jhānas ====
Vipassanā jhānas are stages that describe the development of samatha in vipassanā meditation practice as described in modern Burmese Vipassanā meditation. Mahasi Sayadaw's student Sayadaw U Pandita described the four vipassanā jhānas as follows:

1. The meditator first explores the body/mind connection as one nonduality, discovering the three characteristics. The first jhāna consists in seeing these points and in the presence of vitarka and vicara. Phenomena reveal themselves as arising and falling away.
2. In the second jhāna, the practice seems effortless. Vitarka and vicara both disappear.
3. In the third jhāna, pīti, the joy, disappears too: there is only happiness (sukha) and concentration.
4. The fourth jhāna arises, characterized by purity of mindfulness due to equanimity. The practice leads to direct knowledge. The comfort disappears because the dissolution of all phenomena is clear. The practice shows every phenomenon as unstable, transient, disenchanting. The desire of freedom takes place.

=== Criticism ===
Samatha meditation and jhāna (dhyāna) are often considered synonymous by modern Theravāda, but the four jhānas involve a heightened awareness, instead of a narrowing of the mind.

Vetter notes that samādhi may refer to the four stages of dhyāna meditation, but that only the first stage refers to strong concentration, from which arise the other stages, which include mindfulness. (Note: (Vetter 1988, p. xxvi, note 9; p. 13): "...to put it more accurately, the first dhyāna seems to provide, after some time, a state of strong concentration, from which the other stages come forth; the second stage is called samādhija [...] born from samādhi")

According to Richard Gombrich, the sequence of the four rūpa-jhānas describes two different cognitive states. (Note: Original publication: Gombrich, Richard (2007), "Religious Experience in Early Buddhism (audio lecture)", The Oxford Centre for Hindu Studies, OCHS Library, archived from the original on 2019-02-04) (Note: Gombrich: "I know this is controversial, but it seems to me that the third and fourth jhānas are thus quite unlike the second.") Gombrich and Wynne note that, while the second jhāna denotes a state of absorption, in the third and fourth jhāna one comes out of this absorption, being mindfully aware of objects while being indifferent to it. According to Gombrich, "the later tradition has falsified the jhāna by classifying them as the quintessence of the concentrated, calming kind of meditation, ignoring the other – and indeed higher – element." Alexander Wynne further explains that the dhyāna-scheme is poorly understood. According to Wynne, words expressing the inculcation of awareness, such as sati, sampajāno, and upekkhā, are mistranslated or understood as particular factors of meditative states, whereas they refer to a particular way of perceiving the sense objects. (Note: (Wynne 2007, pp. 106–107): "Thus the expression sato sampajāno in the third jhāna must denote a state of awareness different from the meditative absorption of the second jhāna (cetaso ekodibhāva). It suggests that the subject is doing something different from remaining in a meditative state, i.e. that he has come out of his absorption and is now once again aware of objects. The same is true of the word upek(k)hā: it does not denote an abstract 'equanimity', [but] it means to be aware of something and indifferent to it [...] The third and fourth jhānas, as it seems to me, describe the process of directing states of meditative absorption towards the mindful awareness of objects.")

== Northern tradition ==
The north Indian Buddhist traditions like the Sarvastivada and the Sautrāntika practiced meditation as outlined in texts like the Abhidharmakośakārikā of Vasubandhu and the Yogācārabhūmi-śāstra. The Abhidharmakośakārikā states that vipaśyanā is practiced, once one has reached samādhi ("absorption"), by cultivating the four foundations of mindfulness (smṛtyupasthāna). This is achieved, according to Vasubandhu,

[b]y considering the unique characteristics (svālakṣaṇa) and the general characteristics (sāmānyalakṣaṇā) of the body, sensation, the mind, and the dharmas.

"The unique characteristics" means its self nature (svabhāva).

"The general characteristics" signifies the fact that "All conditioned things are impermanent; all impure dharmas are suffering; and that all the dharmas are empty (śūnya) and not-self (anātmaka).

Asaṅga's Abhidharma-samuccaya states that the practice of śamatha-vipaśyanā is a part of the beginning of a Bodhisattva's path, in the first "path of preparation" (sambhāramarga).

The Sthavira nikāya, one of the early Buddhist schools from which the Theravāda tradition originates, emphasized sudden insight: "In the Sthaviravada [...] progress in understanding comes all at once, 'insight' (abhisamaya) does not come 'gradually' (successively—anapurva)."

The Mahāsāṃghika, another one of the early Buddhist schools, had the doctrine of ekakṣaṇacitta, "according to which a Buddha knows everything in a single thought-instant". This process however, meant to apply only to the Buddha and paccekabuddhas. Lay people may have to experience various levels of insights to become fully enlightened.

== Mahāyāna ==
The later Indian Mahāyāna scholastic tradition, as exemplified by Shantideva's Bodhisattvacaryāvatāra, saw śamatha as a necessary prerequisite to vipaśyanā. Thus, one needed to first begin with calm abiding meditation, and then proceed to insight. In the Pañjikā commentary of Prajñākaramati (Wylie: shes rab 'byung gnas blo gros) on the Bodhisattvacaryāvatāra, vipaśyanā is defined simply as "wisdom (prajñā) that has the nature of thorough knowledge of reality as it is.

=== Śamatha ===
A number of Mahāyāna sūtras address śamatha, usually in conjunction with vipaśyanā. One of the most prominent, the Cloud of Jewels Sutra (Ārya Ratnamegha Sutra, Tib. phags-pa dkon-mchog sprin-gyi mdo, Chinese 寶雲經 T658, 大乘寶雲經 T659) divides all forms of meditation into either śamatha or vipaśyanā, defining śamatha as "single-pointed consciousness" and vipaśyanā as "seeing into the nature of things."

The Sūtra Unlocking the Mysteries (Samdhinirmocana Sūtra), a yogācāra sūtra, is also often used as a source for teachings on śamatha. The Samādhirāja Sūtra is often cited as an important source for śamatha instructions by the Kagyu tradition, particularly via the commentary of Gampopa, although scholar Andrew Skilton, who has studied the Samādhirāja Sūtra extensively, reports that the sūtra itself "contains no significant exposition of either meditational practices or states of mind."

=== Vipassana—prajñā and śūnyatā ===
The Mahayana tradition emphasizes prajñā, insight into śūnyatā, dharmatā, the two truths doctrine, clarity and emptiness, or bliss and emptiness:

[T]he very title of a large corpus of early Mahayana literature, the Prajnaparamita, shows that to some extent the historian may extrapolate the trend to extol insight, prajñā, at the expense of dispassion, virāga, the control of the emotions.

The Mahayana Akṣayamati-nirdeśa refers to vipaśyanā as seeing phenomena as they really are—that is, empty, without self, nonarisen, and without grasping. The Prajnaparamita sūtra in 8,000 lines states that the practice of insight is the non-appropriation of any dharmas, including the five aggregates:

So too, a Bodhisattva coursing in perfect wisdom and developing as such, neither does nor even can stand in form, feeling, perception, impulse, and consciousness... This concentrated insight of a Bodhisattva is called "the non-appropriation of all dharmas".

Although Theravāda and Mahayana are commonly understood as different streams of Buddhism, their emphasis on insight is a common denominator: "In practice and understanding Zen is actually very close to the Theravāda Forest Tradition even though its language and teachings are heavily influenced by Taoism and Confucianism." (Note: (Khantipalo 1984, p. 71, Khantipalo recommends the use of the kōan-like question "Who?" to penetrate "this not-self-nature of the five aggregates": "In Zen Buddhism this technique has been formulated in several kōans, such as 'Who drags this corpse around?'"))

== East Asian Mahāyāna ==
=== Chinese Buddhism ===
In Chinese Buddhism, the works of Tiantai master Zhiyi (such as the Mohe Zhiguan, "Great śamatha-vipaśyanā") are some of the most influential texts to discuss vipaśyanā meditation from a Mahayana perspective. Zhiyi teaches the contemplation of the skandhas, āyatanas, dhātus, kleshas, false views, and several other elements. Likewise the influential text called the Awakening of Faith in the Mahayana has a section on calm and insight meditation. It states:

He who practices "clear observation" should observe that all conditioned phenomena in the world are unstationary and are subject to instantaneous transformation and destruction; that all activities of the mind arise and are extinguished from moment to moment; and that, therefore, all of these induce suffering. He should observe that all that had been conceived in the past was as hazy as a dream, that all that is being conceived in the future will be like clouds that rise up suddenly. He should also observe that the physical existences of all living beings in the world are impure and that among these various filthy things there is not a single one that can be sought after with joy.

=== Chan/Zen ===
The Zen tradition advocates the simultaneous practice of śamatha and vipaśyanā, and this is called the practice of silent illumination. The classic Chan text known as the Platform Sutra states:

Calming is the essence of wisdom. And wisdom is the natural function of calming [i.e., prajñā and samādhi]. At the time of prajñā, samādhi exists in that. At the time of samādhi, prajñā exists in that. How is it that samādhi and prajñā are equivalent? It is like the light of the lamp. When the lamp exists, there is light. When there is no lamp, there is darkness. The lamp is the essence of light. The light is the natural function of the lamp. Although their names are different, in essence, they are fundamentally identical. The teaching of samādhi and prajñā is just like this.

Chan Buddhism emphasizes sudden insight (subitism), though in the Chan tradition, this insight is to be followed by gradual cultivation. This "gradual training" is expressed in teachings as the Five Ranks of enlightenment, the Ten Bulls illustrations that detail the steps on the path, the "Three Mysterious Gates" of Linji, and the "four ways of knowing" of Hakuin Ekaku.

== Indo-Tibetan tradition ==
In Tibetan Buddhism, the practice of śamatha and vipaśyanā is strongly influenced by the Mahāyāna text called the Bhavanakrama of Indian master Kamalaśīla. Kamalaśīla defines vipaśyanā as "the discernment of reality" (bhūta-pratyavekṣā) and "accurately realizing the true nature of dharmas".

According to Thrangu Rinpoche, when śamatha and vipaśyanā are combined (as in the mainstream Mādhyamaka approach of Shantideva and Kamalashila), through śamatha disturbing emotions are abandoned, which thus facilitates vipaśyanā, "clear seeing". Vipaśyanā is cultivated through reasoning, logic, and analysis in conjunction with śamatha.

In contrast, in the siddha tradition of the direct approach of Mahamudra and Dzogchen, vipaśyanā is ascertained directly through looking into one's own mind. After this initial recognition of vipaśyanā, the steadiness of śamatha is developed within that recognition. According to Thrangu Rinpoche, it is also common in the direct approach to first develop enough śamatha to serve vipaśyanā. Dzogchen Ponlop Rinpoche charts the developmental relationship of the practices of śamatha and vipaśyanā this way:

The ways these two aspects of meditation are practised is that one begins with the practice of shamatha; on the basis of that, it becomes possible to practice vipashyana or lhagthong. Through one's practice of vipashyana being based on and carried on in the midst of shamatha, one eventually ends up practicing a unification [yuganaddha] of shamatha and vipashyana. The unification leads to a very clear and direct experience of the nature of all things. This brings one very close to what is called the absolute truth.

=== Samatha ===
Tibetan writers usually define samatha practice as when one's mind remains fixed on a single object without moving. Dakpo Tashi Namgyal for example, defines samatha as:

by fixing the mind upon any object so as to maintain it without distraction... by focusing the mind on an object and maintaining it in that state until finally it is channeled into one stream of attention and evenness.

According to Geshe Lhundup Sopa, samatha is:

just a one-pointedness of mind (cittaikāgratā) on a meditative object (ālambana). Whatever the object may be... if the mind can remain upon its object one-pointedly, spontaneously and without effort (nābhisaṃskāra), and for as long a period of time as the meditator likes, it is approaching the attainment of meditative stabilization (śamatha).

Śamatha furthers the right concentration aspect of the noble eightfold path. The successful result of śamatha is sometimes characterized as meditative absorption (samādhi, ting nge ’dzin) and meditative equipoise (samāhita, mnyam-bzhag), and as freedom from the five obstructions (āvaraṇa, sgrib-pa). It may also result in the siddhis of clairvoyance (abhijñā, mgon shes) and magical emanation (nirmāṇa, sprul pa).

According to Culadasa, "Samatha has five characteristics: effortlessly stable attention (samādhi), powerful mindfulness (sati), joy (pīti), tranquility (passaddhi), and equanimity (upekkhā). The complete state of samatha results from working with stable attention (samādhi) and mindfulness (sati) until joy emerges. Joy then gradually matures into tranquility, and equanimity arises out of that tranquility. A mind in samatha is the ideal instrument for achieving Insight and Awakening". The idea here is that in order to achieve awakening, you have to master both attention, and peripheral awareness. Such as focusing on the breath and being aware of one's peripheral awareness simultaneously.

==== Nine Stages of Tranquility ====
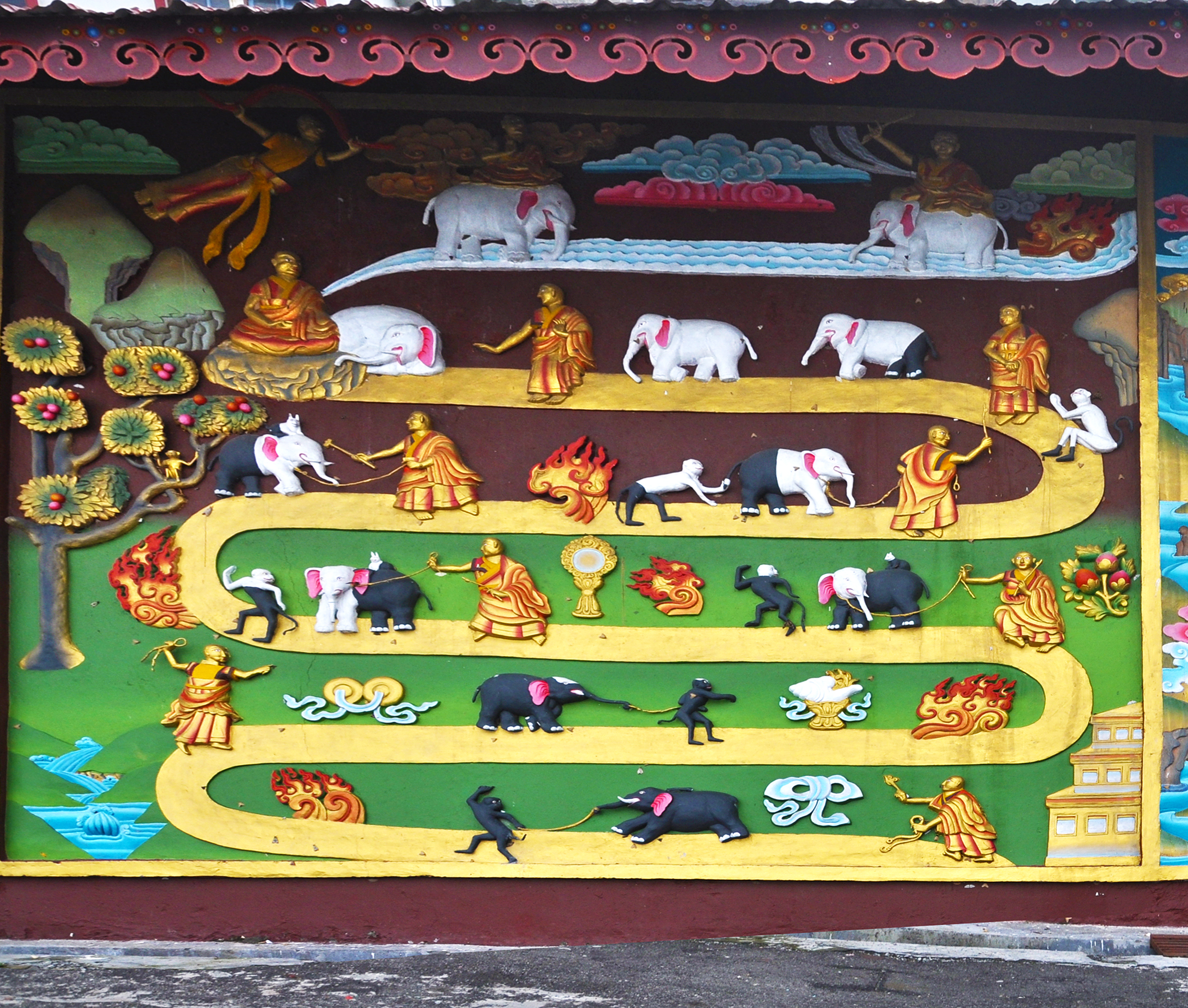
Nine stages of meditation

This formulation is found in various Yogācāra sources such as the Abhidharmasamuccaya and the Śrāvakabhūmi chapter of the Yogācārabhūmi-śāstra. It is also found in the Mahāyānasūtrālaṅkāra, which shows considerable similarity in arrangement and content to the Bodhisattva-bhūmi. (Note: Piya Tan gives a full description of these stages; see Piya Tan (2004), The Taming of the Bull. Mind-training and the formation of Buddhist traditions, dharmafarer.org) In this scheme, śamatha practice is said to progress through nine "mental abidings" or "nine stages of training the mind" (Skt. navākārā cittasthiti, Tib. sems gnas dgu), leading to śamatha proper (the equivalent of "access concentration" in the Theravāda system), and from there to a state of meditative concentration called the first dhyāna (Pāli: jhāna; Tib. bsam gtan) which is often said to be a state of tranquility or bliss.

The "Nine Mental Abidings" as described by Kamalaśīla are:

1. Placement of the mind (Skt. cittasthāpana, Tib. འཇོག་པ – sems ’jog-pa) occurs when the practitioner is able to place their attention on the object of meditation, but is unable to maintain that attention for very long. Distractions, dullness of mind and other hindrances are common.
2. Continuous placement (Skt. samsthāpana, Tib. རྒྱུན་དུ་འཇོག་པ – rgyun-du ‘jog-pa) occurs when the practitioner experiences moments of continuous attention on the object before becoming distracted. According to B. Alan Wallace, this is when the meditator can maintain attention on the meditation object for about a minute.
3. Repeated placement (Skt. avasthāpana, Tib. བླན་ཏེ་འཇོག་པ – slan-te ’jog-pa) is when the practitioner's attention is fixed on the object for most of the practice session; and, further, he or she is able both to immediately realize when his or her mental hold on the object has been lost, and to restore that attention quickly. Sakyong Mipham Rinpoche suggests that being able to maintain attention for 108 breaths is a good benchmark for this stage has been reached.
4. Close placement (Skt. upasthāpana, Tib. ཉེ་བར་འཇོག་པ – nye-bar ’jog-pa) occurs when the practitioner is able to maintain attention throughout the entire meditation session (an hour or more) without losing their mental hold on the meditation object at all. In this stage, the practitioner achieves the power of mindfulness. Nevertheless, this stage still contains subtle forms of excitation and dullness or laxity.
5. Taming (Skt. damana, Tib. དུལ་བར་བྱེད་པ – dul-bar byed-pa) is the level wherein the practitioner achieves deep tranquility of mind, but must still be watchful for subtle forms of laxity or dullness—peaceful states of mind which may be misinterpreted as the desired calm abiding. By focusing on the future benefits of gaining śamatha, the practitioner can "uplift" (Tib. gzengs-bstod) their mind and become more focused and clear.
6. Pacifying (Skt. śamana, Tib. ཞི་བར་བྱེད་པ་ – zhi-bar byed-pa) is the stage during which subtle mental dullness or laxity is no longer a great difficulty, but the practitioner is yet prone to subtle excitements which arise at the periphery of meditative attention. B. Alan Wallace contends that this stage is achieved only after thousands of hours of rigorous training.
7. Fully pacifying (Skt. vyupaśamana, Tib. རྣམ་པར་ཞི་བར་བྱེད་པ་ – nye-bar zhi-bar byed-pa) is a refinement of the previous state; although the practitioner may still experience subtle excitement or dullness, they are rare, and the practitioner can easily recognize and pacify them.
8. Single-pointing (Skt. ekotīkarana, Tib. རྩེ་གཅིག་ཏུ་བྱེད་པ་ – rtse-gcig-tu byed-pa) is the penultimate "abiding"; this is the stage of practice at which the practitioner can reach high levels of concentration with only a slight effort, and without being interrupted by even subtle laxity or excitement during the entire meditation session.
9. Balanced placement (Skt. samādhāna, Tib. མཉམ་པར་འཇོག་པ་བྱེད་པ་ – mnyam-par ’jog-pa) is the final stage of śamatha practice, in this model, and entails that the meditator may now effortlessly reach absorbed concentration (Skt. samadhi, Tib. ting-nge-‘dzin) and maintain it for about four hours without any interruption whatsoever.
10. Śamatha (Tib. ཞི་གནས་ – shyiné) is, as the culmination of this practice, sometimes listed as a tenth stage.

=== Vipassana ===
Indian Mahāyāna Buddhism employed both deductive investigation (applying ideas to experience) and inductive investigation (drawing conclusions from direct experience) in the practice of vipaśyanā. (These correspond respectively to the "contemplative forms" and "experiential forms" in the Theravāda school described above.) (Note: Leah Zahler: "The practice tradition suggested by the Treasury [Abhidharma-kośa] ... — and also by Asaṅga's Grounds of Hearers — is one in which mindfulness of breathing becomes a basis for inductive reasoning on such topics as the five aggregates; as a result of such inductive reasoning, the meditator progresses through the Hearer paths of preparation, seeing, and meditation. It seems at least possible that both Vasubandhu and Asaṅga presented their respective versions of such a method, analogous to but different from modern Theravāda insight meditation, and that Gelukpa scholars were unable to reconstruct it in the absence of a practice tradition because of the great difference between this type of inductive meditative reasoning based on observation and the types of meditative reasoning using consequences (thal 'gyur, prasaṅga) or syllogisms (sbyor ba, prayoga) with which Gelukpas were familiar. Thus, although Gelukpa scholars give detailed interpretations of the systems of breath meditation set forth in Vasubandu's and Asaṅga's texts, they may not fully account for the higher stages of breath meditation set forth in those texts [...] it appears that neither the Gelukpa textbook writers nor modern scholars such as Lati Rinpoche and Gendun Lodro were in a position to conclude that the first moment of the fifth stage of Vasubandhu's system of breath meditation coincides with the attainment of special insight and that, therefore, the first four stages must be a method for cultivating special insight [although this is clearly the case].) According to Leah Zahler, only the tradition of deductive analysis in vipaśyanā was transmitted to Tibet in the sūtrayāna context. (Note: This tradition is outlined by Kamalaśīla in his three Bhāvanākrama texts (particularly the second one), following in turn an approach described in the Laṅkāvatāra Sūtra.) One scholar describes his approach thus: "the overall picture painted by Kamalaśīla is that of a kind of serial alternation between observation and analysis that takes place entirely within the sphere of meditative concentration" in which the analysis portion consists of Madhyamaka reasonings. In Tibet direct examination of moment-to-moment experience as a means of generating insight became exclusively associated with vajrayāna. (Note: According to contemporary Tibetan scholar Thrangu Rinpoche the Vajrayāna cultivates direct experience. "The approach in the sutras [...] is to develop a conceptual understanding of emptiness and gradually refine that understanding through meditation, which eventually produces a direct experience of emptiness [...] we are proceeding from a conceptual understanding produced by analysis and logical inference into a direct experience [...] this takes a great deal of time [...] we are essentially taking inferential reasoning as our method or as the path. There is an alternative [...] which the Buddha taught in the tantras [...] the primary difference between the sutra approach and the approach of Vajrayāna (secret mantra or tantra) is that in the sutra approach, we take inferential reasoning as our path and in the Vajrayāna approach, we take direct experience as our path. In the Vajrayāna we are cultivating simple, direct experience or 'looking.' We do this primarily by simply looking directly at our own mind.") (Note: Khenchen Thrangu Rinpoche also explains: "In general there are two kinds of meditation: the meditation of the paṇḍita who is a scholar and the nonanalytical meditation or direct meditation of the kusulu, or simple yogi... the analytical meditation of the paṇḍita occurs when somebody examines and analyzes something thoroughly until a very clear understanding of it is developed... The direct, nonanalytical meditation is called kusulu meditation in Sanskrit. This was translated as trömeh in Tibetan, which means 'without complication' or being very simple without the analysis and learning of a great scholar. Instead, the mind is relaxed and without applying analysis so it just rests in its nature. In the sūtra tradition, there are some nonanalytic meditations, but mostly this tradition uses analytic meditation.")

=== Mahāmudrā and Dzogchen ===
Samatha is approached somewhat differently in the mahāmudrā tradition as practiced in the Kagyu lineage. As Traleg Kyabgon Rinpoche explains,

In the practice of Mahamudra tranquility meditation [...] we treat all thoughts as the same in order to gain sufficient distance and detachment from our current mental state, which will allow us to ease naturally into a state of tranquility without effort or contrivance [...] In order for the mind to settle, we need to suspend the value judgments that we impose on our mental activities [...] it is essential that we not try to create a state of tranquility but allow the mind to enter into tranquility naturally. This is an important notion in the Mahamudra tradition, that of nondoing. We do not do tranquility meditation, we allow tranquility to arise of its own accord, and it will do so only if we stop thinking of the meditative state as a thing that we need to do actively [...] In a manner of speaking, catching yourself in the act of distraction is the true test of tranquility meditation, for what counts is not the ability to prevent thoughts or emotions from arising but the ability to catch ourselves in a particular mental or emotional state. This is the very essence of tranquility meditation [in the context of Mahāmudrā] [...] The Mahamudra style of meditation does not encourage us toward the different levels of meditative concentration traditionally described in the exoteric meditation manuals [...] From the Mahamudra point of view, we should not desire meditative equipoise nor have an aversion to discursive thoughts and conflicting emotions but view both of these states with equanimity. Again, the significant point is not whether meditative equipoise is present but whether we are able to maintain awareness of our mental states. If disturbing thoughts do arise, as they certainly will, we should simply recognize these thoughts and emotions as transient phenomena.

For the Kagyupa, in the context of mahāmudrā, śamatha by means of mindfulness of breathing is thought to be the ideal way for the meditator to transition into taking the mind itself as the object of meditation and generating vipaśyanā on that basis.

Quite similar is the approach to śamatha found in dzogchen semde (Sanskrit: mahāsandhi cittavarga). In the semde system, śamatha is the first of the four yogas (Tib. naljor, Wylie: rnal-’byor), the others being vipaśyanā (Wylie: lhag-mthong), nonduality (advaya, Tib. nyime,Wylie: gnyis-med), and spontaneous presence (anābogha or nirābogha, Tib. lhundrub, Wylie: lhun-grub). These parallel the four yogas of mahāmudrā.

Ajahn Amaro, a longtime student in the Thai Forest Theravādin tradition of Ajahn Chah, has also trained in the dzogchen semde śamatha approach under Tsoknyi Rinpoche. He found similarities in the approaches of the two traditions to śamatha.

Mahāmudrā and Dzogchen use vipaśyanā extensively. This includes some methods of the other traditions, but also their own specific approaches. They place a greater emphasis on meditating on symbolic images. Additionally in the Vajrayāna (tantric) path, the true nature of mind is pointed out by the guru, and this serves as a direct form of insight. (Note: Thrangu Rinpoche describes the approach using a guru:)

== Similar practices in other religions ==
Meditations from other religious traditions may also be recognised as samatha meditation, that differ in the focus of concentration. In this sense, samatha is not a strictly Buddhist meditation. Samatha, in its single-pointed focus and concentration of mind, is cognate with the sixth "limb" of aṣṭāṅga yoga/rāja yoga, which is concentration (dhāraṇā). For further discussion, see the Yoga Sūtras of Patañjali.

== See also ==
Buddhism

- Kammaṭṭhāna
- Atthakavagga and Parayanavagga
- International Meditation Centre
- Global Vipassana Pagoda
- Jñāna
- Meditation
- Neural mechanisms of mindfulness meditation
- Secular Buddhism
- Upasana
- Vipassana Meditation Centre
- Vipassī Buddha
- Zazen

Taoism

- Taoist meditation
- The Secret of the Golden Flower

Judaism

- Jewish meditation
- Yichudim

Christianity

- Christian contemplation
- Hesychasm

Hinduism

- Samatva

Islam

- Muraqaba

== Sources ==
Printed sources

- Arbel, Keren (2016), Early Buddhist Meditation: The Four Jhanas as the Actualization of Insight, Routledge, doi:10.4324/9781315676043, ISBN 9781317383994
- Bond, George D. (1992), The Buddhist Revival in Sri Lanka: Religious Tradition, Reinterpretation and Response, Motilal Banarsidass Publishers
- Bronkhorst, Johannes (1993), The Two Traditions Of Meditation In Ancient India, Motilal Banarsidass Publ.
- Brooks, Jeffrey S. (2006), A Critique of the Abhidhamma and Visuddhimagga, archived from the original on 2012-08-30
- Buddhadasa Bhikkhu (2014), Heartwood of the Bodhi Tree, Wisdom publications
- Buswell, Robert, ed. (2004), Encyclopedia of Buddhism (PDF), MacMillan, ISBN 978-0-02-865718-9, archived from the original (PDF) on 2018-06-29
- Cousins, L. S. (1996), "The origins of insight meditation" (PDF), in Skorupski, T. (ed.), The Buddhist Forum IV, seminar papers 1994–1996 (pp. 35–58), London, UK: School of Oriental and African Studies, archived (PDF) from the original on 2021-05-07
- Dhammadharo, Ajaan Lee (1982), The Craft of the Heart (PDF), Taveekij Press, archived (PDF) from the original on 2021-07-09
- Fronsdal, Gil (1998), "Chapter 9: Insight Meditation in the United States: Life, Liberty, and the Pursuit of Happiness", in Prebish, Charles S.; Tanaka, Kenneth K. (eds.), The Faces of Buddhism in America, archived from the original on 2019-06-07
- Ginsberg, Mitchell (1996), The Far Shore: Vipassanā, the Practice of Insight, Motilal Banarsidass
- Gomez, Luis O. (1991), "Purifying Gold: The Metaphor of Effort and Intuition in Buddhist Thought and Practice", in Gregory, Peter N. (ed.), Sudden and Gradual. Approaches to Enlightenment in Chinese Thought, Delhi: Motilal Banarsidass Publishers
- Gombrich, Richard F. (1997), How Buddhism Began. The Conditioned Genesis of the Early Teachings, New Delhi: Munshiram Manoharlal Publishers
- Gunaratana, Henepola (2011), Mindfulness in plain English, Wisdom Publications, p. 21, ISBN 978-0861719068, archived from the original on 2017-01-02
- Gunaratana, Henepola (2009), Beyond Mindfulness in Plain English: An Introductory Guide to Deeper States of Meditation, Simon and Schuster
- Khantipalo, Bikkhu (1984), Calm and Insight. A buddhist Manual for Meditators, London and Dublin: Curzon Press Ltd.
- Khippapanyo, Venerable Acariya (2020), Treasure Trove, San Fran Dhammaram Temple
- Klein, Anne Carolyn; Wangyal, Geshe Tenzin, Rinpoche (2006). Unbounded Wholeness. Oxford University Press. ISBN 0-19-517849-1.
- McMahan, David L. (2008), The Making of Buddhist Modernism, Oxford University Press, ISBN 9780195183276
- Nyanaponika (1998), Het hart van boeddhistische meditatie (The heart of Buddhist Meditation), Asoka
- Perdue, Daniel E. (2014-05-27). The Course in Buddhist Reasoning and Debate: An Asian Approach to Analytical Thinking Drawn from Indian and Tibetan Sources. Shambhala Publications. ISBN 9780834829558. Archived from the original on 2019-12-12.
- Ray, Reginald A., ed. (2004). "The Practice of Hinayana". In the Presence of Masters: Wisdom from 30 Contemporary Tibetan Buddhist Teachers. Boston, Massachusetts: Shambala. ISBN 978-1-57062-849-8.
- Schumann, Hans Wolfgang (1997), Boeddhisme, Asoka
- Shankman, Richard (2008). The Experience of Samādhi: An In-depth Exploration of Buddhist Meditation. Shambhala. ISBN 978-1-59030-521-8.
- Sharf, Robert H. (1995), "Buddhist Modernism and the Rhetoric of Meditative Experience" (PDF), NUMEN, 42 (3): 228–283, doi:10.1163/1568527952598549, hdl:2027.42/43810
- Stuart, Daniel M. (2020), S.N. Goenka: Emissary of Insight, Shambhala Publications, ISBN 9781611808186, archived from the original on 2020-11-16
- Thanissaro Bhikkhu (1997), One Tool Among Many. The Place of Vipassana in Buddhist Practice, archived from the original on 2010-04-12
- Vetter, Tilmann (1988), The Ideas and Meditative Practices of Early Buddhism, BRILL
- Warder, A.K. (2000), Indian Buddhism, Delhi: Motilal Banarsidass Publishers
- Wilson, Jeff (2014), Mindful America: The Mutual Transformation of Buddhist Meditation and American Culture, Oxford University Press
- Wynne, Alexander (2007), The Origin of Buddhist Meditation, Routledge

Web-sources
