= Balangoda Ananda Maitreya Thero =

Sri Lankan Buddhist monk and scholar

Most Ven. Agga Maha Pandita Balangoda Ananda Maitreya Thera
- Ananda Maitreya Thera
- Title: President of Amarapura Nikaya; Vice Chancellor of Vidyodaya University; Chancellor of Sabaragamuwa University of Sri Lanka; Professor of Buddhism; Abidhadja Maharattaguru; Agga Maha Pandita; Thripitaka Vaagishwaracharya Pravachana Visharada Raajakeeya Panditha; Saahithyasuuri; Saahithya Chakrawarthi

Personal life
- Born: Punchi Mahattaya; 23 August 1896 Balangoda, British Ceylon
- Died: 18 July 1998 (aged 101) Colombo, Sri Lanka
- Education: Ananda College

Religious life
- Religion: Buddhism
- Lineage: Amarapura Sect
- Dharma name: Balangdoda Ananda Maitreya Thera

Balangoda Ananda Maitreya Thera (Sinhala: අග්ග මහා පණ්ඩිත බලංගොඩ ආනන්ද මෛත්‍රෙය මහා නා හිමිපාණන් වහන්සේ) (23 August 1896 — 18 July 1998) was a Sri Lankan Buddhist monk who was one of the most distinguished scholars and expositors of Theravāda Buddhism in the twentieth century. He was highly respected by Sri Lankan Buddhists, who believed that he had achieved a higher level of spiritual development. Sri Lankan Buddhists also considered Balangoda Ananda Maitreya Thera as a Bodhisattva, who will attain Buddhahood in a future life.

Balangoda Ananda Maitreya Thera lived a modest life and did a great service for the propagation of Buddhist philosophy. In recognition of his valuable service at the Sixth Buddhist council held in Burma, the Burmese government conferred on him the title of Agga Maha Pandita (Chief Great Scholar) in 1956. Later in March 1997, the Burmese government conferred on Balangoda Ananda Maitreya Thera the highest Sangha title, Abhidhaja Maha Rattha Guru (Most Eminent Great Spiritual Teacher), which is equivalent to Sangharaja, in honor of his unique service to the Buddhist religion.

== Biography ==
Balangoda Ananda Maitreya Thera was born on 23 August 1896 in Kirindigala, Balangoda, to the family of N. A. Matthias Appuhamy (Maddumahamy) and B. Heenmanike. His birth name was Punchi Mahattaya. His mother died when he was 14 days old and he was brought up by his father's brother and his wife. His primary education was at Kumara Vidyalaya, Balangoda. He had his secondary education from Ananda College Colombo. At the age of 15, he had decided to enter the order of Buddhist monks and was ordained as a Samanera at the temple Sri Nandaramaya, Udumulla, Balangoda on 2 March 1911. He was ordained under the guidance of Daamahana Dhammananda Thera and Deniyaye Seelananda Thera was his primary teacher (Upaadhyaayanwahanse). Balangdoda Ananda Maitreya Thera received his Upasampada on 14 July 1916 at Olu Gantota Udakukhepa Seema, Balangoda.

Ananda Maitreya Thera continued his studies after becoming a monk and later became a scholar in Buddhism and languages. Ananda Maitreya Thera entered Ananda College, Colombo in 1919 and became a teacher at the same school in 1922. Unusually for a Theravāda teacher, he publicly studied some other traditions, such as Mahāyāna Buddhism, mantra, and esoteric yoga.

Ananda Maitreya Thera was the first Dharmarcharya (teacher of Buddhism) at Nalanda College Colombo when it was first established in 1925. It was Ananda Maitreya Thera who named it 'Nalanda' and chose Apadana Sobhini Panna meaning wisdom beautifies character as Nalanda College's motto, which is still being used. Later he became the professor of Mahayana Buddhism at Vidyodaya University, Sri Lanka. He was appointed to the post of Dean, Faculty of Buddhist Studies in 1963. On 1 October 1966, he was appointed to the post of vice chancellor at the same university.

Ananda Maitreya Thera's first overseas Dhamma journey was to Kerala, India in 1926. He opened the Sri Dhammananda Pirivena, Colombo in 1930.

On 18 January 1954, Ananda Maitreya Thera was appointed to the post of Sangha Nayaka of Sabaragamu-Saddhammawansa Nikaya and in the same year, he participated in the Sixth Buddhist council held in Myanmar. On 2 September 1969, Ananda Maitreya Thera was appointed as the President of Amarapura Sangha Sabhā of Sri Lanka.

Ananda Maitreya Thera was famous for his achievements in Buddhist meditation. He was known to have practiced both Samatha meditation and Vipassana meditation to a great extent and was considered to be having a highly developed mind through his meditation. Many Buddhists have experienced his powerful spiritual blessings in many more ways than one. His teachings and life have been an inspiration to many aspiring monks and lay followers.

Ananda Maitreya Thera, along with Narada Thera and Madihe Pannaseeha Thera, was and still is one of the foremostly revered and respected Buddhist monks of the twentieth century in Sri Lanka. His work and sacrifices with Anagarika Dharmapala were one of the steering forces of the upholding of Buddhism in Sri Lanka at one stage. They also traveled to many countries in the world for the propagation of Buddhism. Balangoda Ananda Maitreya Thera died at 11.40 p.m. on 18 July 1998 at the age of 101.

== Degrees and titles ==
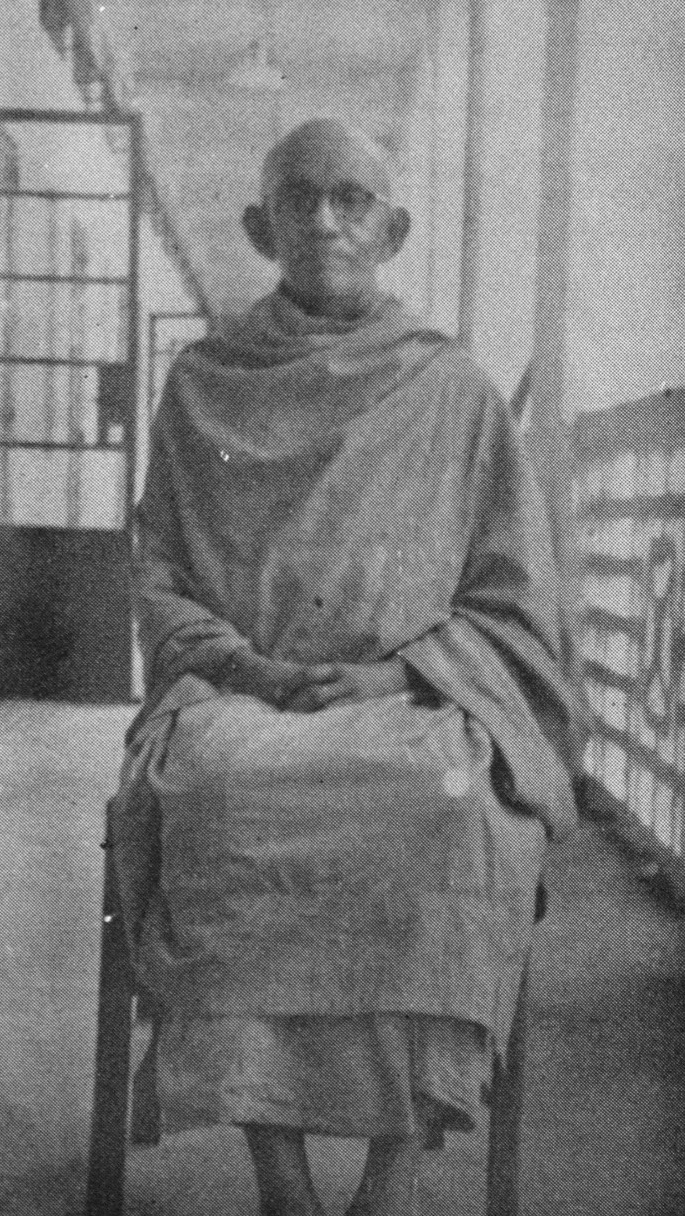
Ananda Maitreya Thera at the 6th Buddhist council held in Burma

In 1955, the Government of Myanmar (then Burma) conferred him the title Agga Maha Pandita (Great Chief Scholar) to honor his unprecedented service at the Sixth Buddhist Council. To honor his unique service to the Buddha Śāsana, Myanmar also conferred him the highest Sangha title, Abhidhaja Maharatthaguru (Most Eminent Great Spiritual Teacher), which is equivalent to Sangharaja in 1997. Ananda Maithreya Thera received the Thripitaka Vaagishwaracharya Pravachana Visharada Raajakeeya Panditha honorary degree from the Government of Sri Lanka. In addition to that, Nayaka Thera has received two honorary titles, Saahithyasuuri from Vidyodaya University and Saahithya Chakrawarthi from Vidyalankara University.

The humbleness of Maha Nayaka Thera's character is clearly shown when he publicly stated that he had no liking whatsoever for titles and awards, but that he was rather accepting it to satisfy the presenter. He quoted Buddha in his speech saying "I often remind myself of my Great Buddha's preaching in the Samyutta Nikaya or the Abhidhamma Pitaka of the worthlessness and futileness of the craving for awards, titles, and commanding positions."

== Survey of writings ==
Ananda Maitreya Thera wrote nearly fifty books on Suttas (scripture), Vinaya (monastic discipline), on Abhidhamma (philosophy), and on Pali and Sanskrit grammar. His book, Sakyasimhavadanaya hevat Buddha Charitra (The Life of the Buddha), is considered as a textbook. Most of his books are written in English and Sinhala languages.

- Meditation on Breathing
- Easy Steps to English
- Life of the Buddha
- Bhavana Deepaniya
- Sambodhi Prarthana
- A Hand Book of Spoken English
- Dhamsabhava
- Sathara Paramarthaya
- Buddha Dharmaya
- Vidharshana Bhavanava
- Meditation sur la respiration
- Maithree Bhavanava
- Anaphanasathi Bhavanava
- Shamatha Bhavanava
- Udānaya

Ananda Maitreya Thera translation of the Dhammapada is published internationally.

- The Dhammapada: The Path of Truth: Softcover, Wisdom Pubns, ISBN 0-932156-04-5.
