= Ashin Munindabhivamsa =

Burmese Theravada Buddhist monk (1946–2024)

Sayadaw Bhaddanta Ashin Munindābhivaṃsa
- မုနိန္ဒာဘိဝံသ
- Title: Agga Mahā Paṇḍita (2006); Agga Mahā Ganthavācaka Paṇḍita (1992)

Personal life
- Born: 13 December 1946 Thanatpin Township, British Burma
- Died: 19 June 2024 (aged 77) Tada-U Township, Myanmar
- Cause of death: Assassination
- Pen name: Shindan Sayadaw

Religious life
- Religion: Buddhism
- Temple: Win Neinmitayon Monastery
- School: Theravada
- Sect: Shwekyin Nikāya
- Dharma names: Muninda

Ashin Munindābhivaṃsa (Burmese: ဘဒ္ဒန္တမုနိန္ဒာဘိဝံသ; 13 December 1946 – 19 June 2024), also known as Shindan Sayadaw, was a Burmese scholar monk and chief abbot of Win Neinmitayon Monastery in Bago. Recipient of the title of Agga Maha Pandita, he was a member of the central executive committee of the Shwegyin Nikaya, the second largest monastic order in Myanmar. The assassination of Munindābhivaṃsa, a member of the State Sangha Maha Nayaka Committee, in June 2024 led to a confrontation between the Burmese military (the Tatmadaw) and founding members of the monastery.

== Early life and education ==
The eldest son of Tun Shwe and Kyeyin, Munindābhivaṃsa was born in Thanatpin Township in Bago Division on 13 December 1946. Novitiated under the 5th Kyakhhetwine Sayadaw at the age of 10, he passed his first examination titled vinyānuggaha sāmanera bhāņaka sīla sikkhā at age 11. He passed the government examination of Dhammācariya at 17, ranked second in the country. In addition to his degrees in three examinations of Dhammācariya, Munindābhivaṃsa was also bestowed the title of Dhīghabhāņaka upon the completion of Sutta Piṭaka at the Tripitaka Examinations.

== Life as an instructor ==
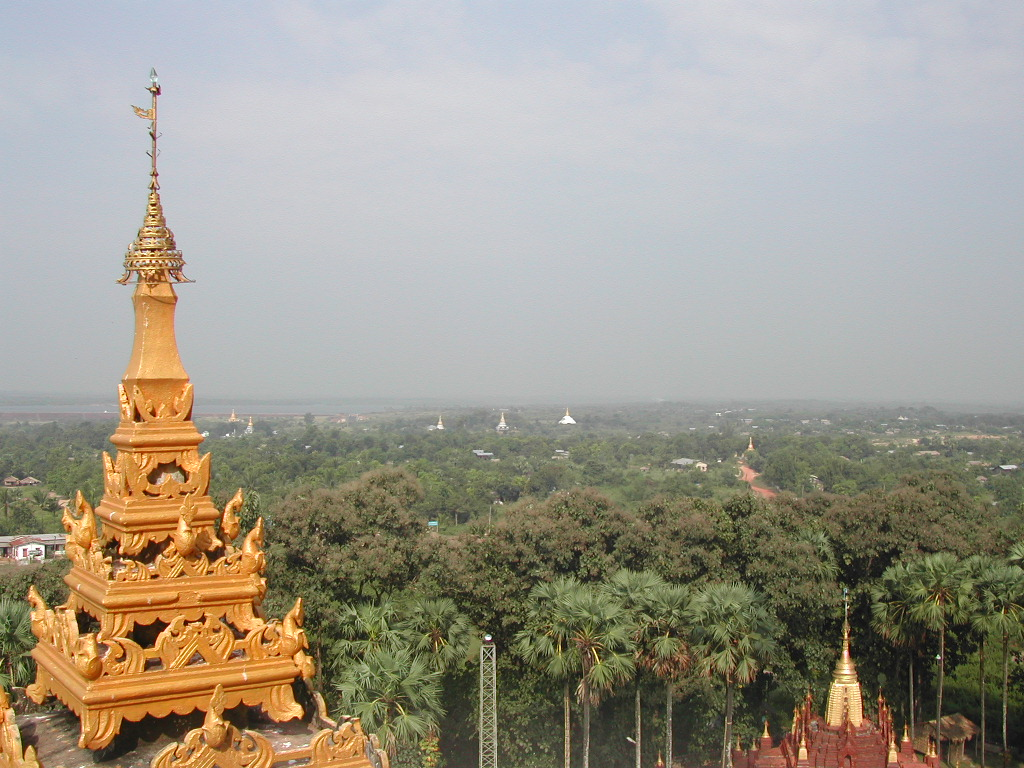
The city of Bago, home to the Win Neinmitayon Monastery where Ashin Munindabhivamsa was an abbot

Munindābhivaṃsa had started his career as an instructor since he was 14 years old, at the Kyakhetwine Monastery. He founded the Win Neinmitayon Monastery in 2003 at which he took the role of chief abbot until his death.

He also compiled religious writings under the title of Shindan (lit. 'Explanation') and was known as Shindan Sayadaw. He received the title for senior instructor Agga Maha Ganthavācaka Pandita from the government in 1992. He was offered the titles of Agga Maha Saddhama Jotikadhaja and Agga Maha Pandita in 2006.

He had served as a member of the State Sangha Maha Nayaka Committee for 8 years and was also in charge of State Vinayadhara. Upon his death, he was a wunsaung sayadaw, which literally represents who accepts and carries out a specific responsibility, and a member of the central executive committee of the Shwegyin Nikaya.

== Death ==
The assassination of Munindābhivaṃsa occurred on 19 June 2024. As he left the Mandalay International Airport, his vehicle was shot at by Tatmadaw soldiers after it allegedly refused to stop at a security checkpoint. The soldiers claimed that they believed opposition PDF fighters were in the car since the windows were closed. They then confiscated the monks' phones and coerced them into silence.

=== Aftermath ===
Initially, army general Zaw Min Tun blamed an explosion from a PDF landmine on Munindābhivaṃsa's death. Two days later, however, he admitted that soldiers fired warning shots and shouted at his van to pull over before shooting at it from behind: only after Kanthonsint Sayadaw who accompanied Munindābhivaṃsa in the car revealed that they were attacked by the Tatmadaw soldiers. The military junta promised to take action on those responsible for the attack. On 20 June, the chief minister of Bago Region addressed the founding members of the monastery and stated that the ruling junta had been unaware of the actual circumstances, but the monastery officials replied that they wanted an official apology. On 24 June, Min Aung Hlaing's official letter of condolences and apology was read by the minister of religious affairs. The current Kyakhetwine Sayadaw said that it was sorrowful and painful, and at the same time, it was unforgettable [and unforgivable].
