= Shindan =

Shindan may refer to:

- Japanese for diagnosis
- Shindan Castle, a castle on the Iran-Azerbaijan border
- Shindan Sayadaw, also known as Ashin Munindabhivamsa (1946 – 2024), a Burmese monk

== See also ==
- Shindand (disambiguation)
