= Taung Galay Sayadaw =

Karen Buddhist monk and author

Thiri Pyanchi, Agga Maha Kammatthanacariya Taung Kalay Sayadaw Ashin Paññāsāmī
- Title: Agga Maha Saddhamma Jotikadhaja

Personal life
- Born: Saw Phoe Thu; 14 July 1960 (age 65) Hlar Ka Myin village, Hpa-an, Karen State, Burma
- Parent(s): Aung Khin, Nan Sein Hla Khin
- Known for: Ahimsa; Vegetarianism
- Other names: Myaing Aye Tin, Taung Ka Lay Sayadaw
- Pen name: Tawhmi Rahan, Aee Koe

Religious life
- Religion: Buddhism
- Order: Agga Maha Saddhamma Jotikadhaja (2012); Thiri Pyanchi (2022); Agga Maha Kammatthanacariya (2023)
- School: Sudhammā
- Dharma names: U Paññāsāmī
- Profession: Buddhist monk

Senior posting
- Based in: Taung Galay Monastery, Hpa-an, Karen State, Myanmar
- Website: mahar.asia

The Venerable Taung Kalay (Taung Galay) Sayadaw Ashin Paññāsāmī (Ashin Pyinnathami; Burmese: တောင်ကလေးဆရာတော် ဦးပညာသာမိ; born Saw Phoe Thu on 14 July 1960) is a Karen Buddhist monk, writer, and historian.

== Early life ==
Ven. Taung Galay Sayadaw was born Saw Phoe Thu to Aung Khin and Nan Sein Hla Khin on Thursday, 14 July 1960 (the 7th waning day of Warso in 1322 Myanmar era) in Hlar Ka Myin village in Hpa-an Township, Karen State, Burma.

== Shin Paññāsāmī ==
At the age of 8, he was novitiated on 14 March 1968 (the 7th waxing moon of Tapaung in the 1329 Myanmar era), with Sayadaw Badanda Thuriya of Hlar Ka Myin Monastery as the preceptor and his parents as the organizer and supporter of the ordination ceremony.

At the age of twenty-one, on 21 March 1981 (the 1st waxing moon of Tapaung in the 1342 Myanmar era), the novice Paññāsāmī was fully ordained as a Buddhist monk; his preceptor was Bhaddanda Thuzarta, the Shwebo Kyaung Sayadaw in Hpa-An, and his parents supporting the ordination.

== Monkhood and awards ==
The pursuit of monastic education by Sayadaw Ashin Paññāsāmīi has been remarkable. He has passed many monastic examinations, some with honors: the Abhidharma exam, the Pali Pahtamabyan Examinations, the Thuthama Saya exam, the Thaddhama Parla exam, the Pidhakaya Paraku exam, Vinaya exam, and exam for a comparative study of world religions. In addition to these accomplishments, during 1989–1990, he informally learned Sanskrit and Pali from Dr. Zagara Abivansa, the Raza Giri Sayadaw of Sampurnanand Sanskrit Vishwavidyalaya and Nava Nalanda Mahavihara. Through continuous learning, Sayadaw's relentless efforts to seek wisdom have earned him an Hon. Doctor of Oriental Learning (Ph.D.) in history from the Indian Institute of Oriental Heritage, Kolkata, India in 2013. In November 2022, Sayadaw was awarded the honor of Thiri Pyanchi by the government of Myanmar. On January 4, 2023, Sayadaw was awarded the honor of Agga Maha Kammatthanacariya, the title of 'Great Noble Meditation Master', by the government of Myanmar.

== Publications ==
Paññāsāmī writes under various pen names. Under the pen name of Aee Koe (အဲးခိုး), he has been regularly writing articles for The Myanmar Herald Journal (မြန်မာသံတော်ဆင့်) and under the pen name of Tawhmi Rahan, he has written many books, articles, and poems on different topics ranging from Buddhist teachings, literature, and culture, children stories to environment, politics, and peace. The Sayadaw of Me Nu Ok Kyaung Monastery, The Noble Truth of Buddha, The Virtues of Buddha and Its Power, Cherish the Life of Others, Children's Stories of Animals, and The Battlefield in Myanmar are on the list of over 100 books that have been written and published by Paññāsāmī. He had also been part of the team that compiled the Pwo Kayin-English-Myanmar Dictionary.

1. (သတိပဠာန်လေးပါးတရားတော်) - Four Aspects of Satipatthana
2. (ကလေးများအတွက်မြတ်ဗုဒ္ဓဝိပါတ်တော်၁၂ပါး) - 12 Buddhha's Vipāka Stories for Children
3. (အရှေ့ပိုးကရင်အမျိုးသားချည်ဖြူဖွဲ့မင်္ဂလာ(ပိုးကရင်ဘာသာ)) - White Thread Wrist Tying Culture of East Pwo Karen
4. (မယ်နုအုတ်ကျောင်းဆရာတော်) - The Monk of Me Nu Ok Kyaung (Me Nu's Brick Monastery)
5. (အရိယသစ္စဒဿန)
6. (ကော့ဂွန်းဂူသမိုင်း) - The History of Kawtgon Cave
7. (ဗုဒ္ဓဂုဏ်တော်နှင့်ကိုယ်တွေ့ဖြစ်ရပ်ဆန်းများ)
8. (ကလေးများအတွက်ဟိတောပဒေသ)
9. (တောလေးဆယ်)
10. (ပဠာန်းပါဠိတော်ဖတ်နည်းကျက်မှတ်နည်း)
11. (ဇယစက္ကအောင်မြေ(၁၀၀၀)(သမိုင်းပြစာတမ်း))
12. (သူ့အသက်ကိုချစ်ပါလေ)
13. (ဖောင်တော်ဦးစေတီတော်သမိုင်းနှင့်သုဓနဝတ္ထု)
14. (ပဒုံဂူသမိုင်း)
15. (ပဋ္ဌာန်းဆရာတော်အရှင်ဝဇီရဗုဒ္ဓီဘိဝံသ၏ထေရုပ္ပတ္ထိ)
16. (ဘားအံမြို့သေဋ္ဌမာရ်အောင်ဘုရားကြီးသမိုင်း)
17. (ဒေါသကိုထိန်းဘေးရန်ငြိမ်း)
18. (မဇ္ဈိမခရီး)
19. (ကေလာသတောင်ခြေမှာ)
20. (ကလေးများအတွက်လောကနီတိ)
21. (ကလေးများအတွက်စာဏကျနီတိ)
22. (ဆရာတော်ဦးဗုဒ်စကား)
23. (ဆရာတော်ဦးသီလစကား)
24. Bodh Gaya a kyaung thi kaung sa yar (ဗုဒ္ဓဂယာအကြောင်းသိကောင်းစရာ(ဗုဒ္ဓစာပေဆုဒုတိယ)) - Bodh Gaya (2001)
25. (မြတ်ဗုဒ္ဓသာသနာတော်ခေတ်နှင့်သမိုင်းအမြင်(ဗုဒ္ဓစာပေဆုပထမ))
26. (ယောဂီသူမြတ်ကျင့်အပ်လှ)
27. (မြစ်ကူးလှေ)
28. (စံရိပ်ငြိမ်တရားများ)
29. (စန္ဒကူးရနံ့များ)
30. (စန္ဒန၏စာပန်းအိမ်)
31. (တောမှီရဟန်း၏စာစုခရီး)
32. (ဓမ္မာသောက၏ဓမ္မအောင်ပွဲ(ပြဇာတ်))
33. (အေးငြိမ်းချမ်းသာမင်္ဂလာ)
34. (ကရင်ပြည်နယ်မေတ္တာခရီး)
35. (ကလေးများအတွက်မြင့်မြတ်သောမိခင်(ကဗျာ))
36. (အမှတ်တရဗုဒ္ဓဂါယာ)
37. (၁၂လရာသီအရှေ့ပိုးကရင်ယဥ်ကျေးမှု)
38. (ကုသိနာရုံပိဋကတ်တော်နှင့်သုတေသနစာတမ်း)
39. (စတုရာရက္ခစာတမ်း)
40. (မြန်မာသူအိမ်ရှင်မ) - Myanmar Housewife
41. (ဓမ္မသာကစ္ဆာမင်္ဂလာ)
42. (ကရင့်စာဆိုများ)
43. (အိန္ဒိယမှဘာသာများ)
44. (ရတနာကိုရှာဖွေခြင်း)
45. (ငှက်မင်း၏စကားသံ) - The Voice of Bird King
46. (ခရီးလမ်း) - The Journey
47. (မောရိယ၏ဓမ္မသာရထိ)
48. (ရှုဖွယ်ဗုဒ္ဓနေရာ)
49. (တိုင်းရင်းသားကရင်လူမျိုးများ) - Ethnic Karen People
50. (အိုးမလုပ်ခင်အိုးဖုတ်စဥ်ဝယ်)
51. (ကရင်+မြန်မာ+အင်္ဂလိပ်အဘိဓါန်)
52. (ကရင်တို့ဒေသဗုဒ္ဓသာသနာ)
53. (မဂ်ချမ်းသာ)
54. (လောကနီတိ(ကရင်ဘာသာ))
55. (ဓမ္မစက္တပဝတ္ထနသုတ္တန်(ကရင်ဘာသာ))
56. (ကမ္မဝါစာ(ကရင်ဘာသာ))
57. (ပန်းကလေးလိုလှပါစေ)
58. (ဓမ္မပဒ(ကရင်ဘာသာ))
59. (ဓမ္မပဒ(မြန်မာဘာသာ))
60. (ဖလီ(ကရင်ဘာသာကဗျာ))
61. (ထီ့ဒိုက်ဒါန်(ကရင်ဘာသာကဗျာ))
62. (စန္ဒန၏အတ္ထုပတ္တိ)
63. (ဓမ္မခရီးသည်) - Dharma Traveller
64. (မေတ္တာဘာဝနာပွားများနည်း)
65. (မြန်မာ့နန်းစဥ်ရတနာရှာပုံတော်)
66. (တမလွန်ဘဝချမ်းသာမှု) - Afterlife Peace
67. (ကော့ဂွန်းဂူတောရခရီး) - Journey to Kawtgon Cave
68. (လောကနီတိ(မြန်မာဘာသာ))
69. (ဇွဲကပင်တောင်သွားရအောင်) - Let's Go to Mount Zwegabin
70. (ရွှေစေတီတောရခရီး)
71. (အရှေ့ပိုးကရင်စာပေအညွှန်း)
72. (ကံ၏အဆုံးအဖြတ်) -
73. (နောက်ဆုံးဆယ်လအစိုးရ(နိုင်ငံရေးဆောင်းပါးများ))
74. (ထုတ်ပယ်ထိုက်သူ)
75. (ဝေသာလီသို့သွားရအောင်) - Let's Go to Vaishali
76. (ဗုဒ္ဓဘာသာကိုအကျိုးပြုသူများ)
77. (ညှို့ကွင်း)
78. (အပြစ်ကိုဘယ်ရေနဲ့ဆေးမလဲ) - Which water do you use to wash your sins?
79. (ဖူကိုယားမား၏သမိုင်းနိဂုံး)
80. (ဖလုံလိက်ခေါင်းထိုက်ကရင်စာပေသင်ကြားရေးကောက်နုတ်ချက်)
81. (မာရ်မင်း၏ကျော့ကွင်း)
82. (ဝေဠုဝန်ဥယျာဥ်သာဝယ်)
83. (သားသမီးနှင့်မိဘ) - Offspring and Parents
84. (ငြိမ်းချမ်းသောနိုင်ငံတော်မှအပြန်)
85. (ပဗ္ဗာဇနိယကမ္မဝါ(ကရင်ဘာသာ))
86. (ဝါခေါင်လချည်ဖြူဖွဲ့မင်္ဂလာအကြောင်း(ကရင်ဘာသာ))
87. (သစ္စာရှိသောမြန်မာနိုင်ငံမှကရင်လူမျိုးများ)
88. (အရှေ့ပိုးကရင်ယဥ်ကျေးမှုနှင့်စာပေ)
89. (ဝေဖန်ပြီးမှယုံပါ) - Criticize before believe
90. (နိုးကြားသူအားဘေးမရှိ) - No harm to those who are alert
91. (ဘောင်ဘင်မခတ်နှင့်တပည့်)
92. (ချမ်းသာစွာအိပ်စက်နိုင်ကြပါစေ) - May you sleep soundly
93. (ပိုးကရင်စာပေအခြေခံသဒ္ဒါ(ကရင်+မြန်မာ)) - Pwo Karen Basic Grammar
94. (မြန်မာတို့တစ်နှစ်အတွင်းစစ်တလင်း) - Battlefield in Myanmar in one year (2009); (About Burma History from 1824 to 1948).
95. (ပါဋလိပုတ္တဂါမ)
96. (သတိပေးပြတိုက်)
97. (ဥာဏ်ဖြင့်ရှု့၍ဆင်ခြေပါ)
98. (သရဏံဂုဏ်တရားတော်)
99. (ပါရမီဆယ်ပါးနံနက်ခင်းသြဝါဒများ)
100. (ဗုဒ္ဓယဥ်ကျေးမှုနေရာများ)
101. (မြန်မာသံတော်ဆင့်တွင်ရေးသားသောဆောင်းပါးများ) - Articles featured in The Myanmar Herald
102. (ငြိမ်းချမ်းမှုနှင့်သင့်မြတ်မှု) - Peace and Harmony
103. (ရတနာခရီး)
104. (ရွှေရောင်ပြတောရခရီး)
105. Avihiṃsā naing gan yay (အဝိဟိံသာနိုင်ငံရေး) - Avihiṃsā Politics
106. (အေးမြသာခေါင်သာမညတောင်) - Peaceful Mount Thamanya
107. (ဘဝသံသရာ) - Life Saṃsāra
108. (ကျောင်းထိုင်ဆရာတော်လက်စွဲ) - Handbook for Abbot
109. (အမြင့်မြတ်ဆုံးအမျိုးသမီး(သို့)အနှိုင်းမဲ့အဖြည့်ခံ)
110. (ဓမ္မနို့ရည်ကဗျာစုစည်းမှု)

== Community work ==
The Venerable Sayadaw has also engaged in several other religious and social activities such as preaching the Buddha's sermons, practicing and teaching mediations, renovating pagodas and taking the roles of National Sangha Committee members. He has renovated over 20 ancient pagodas and donated new Hti (umbrella crowns) around the country. He has also founded 10 monasteries and 6 Monastic Education Schools in Kayin State to create broader access to education for children in rural areas and build an educated society.

Since 1993, Sayadaw has engaged in the Karen Peace Council (KPC) as a leading peace negotiator for the peace in Kayin State. He has also served as a patron for the Myanmar Peace Foundation. In 2001, he established a social group called Phlon Education Development Unit (PEDU) and began extensive social and local development works in Kayin State. In 1996, he opened a monastic school for children from kindergarten through tenth grade. He also founded First Aid Groups in partnership with the Myanmar Red Cross and established the orthopedic rehabilitation center in Hpa-an township. On 10 September 2017, a completion ceremony for midwives training was held at the Taung Kalay Monastic School. Sayadaw also awards scholarships to outstanding students. He set up Nat Say Taman Scholarship Funds and provided financial assistance to students in Kayin State while serving as a patron for Karen Student Center (KSC), a boarding school for students from remote villages that lack access to education. In 2009, he went to Australia and established the Karen Melbourne Buddhist Association to promote Buddhism and provide spiritual counseling based on Buddha teaching to the Karen community there. He was officially awarded the honorary titles of Thaddhama Jotika Dhaja in 1991 and Maha Thaddhama Jotika Dhaja in 2001 by the government of Myanmar. In 2002, Sayadaw also received the Buddhist Literature Award from Japan.

Due to his influential impact on the local community, he is frequently visited by politicians, government officials, Karen leaders, KNU officers, and many other local leaders. It is also reported that Taung Galay Sayadaw sent condolences to the passing of Padoh Saw David Taw who was the secretary of the KNU Peace Committee and also a member of a KNU delegation that negotiated peace with the Burmese government in January 2012.

== Activities abroad ==
The Venerable Sayadaw has traveled extensively. He has traveled to India, Nepal, and Sri Lanka in 1994, Thailand and Singapore in 1997, Japan in 2000, Australia in 2009, and America in 2015, and conducted Dhamma talks with the Myanmar community in those countries as well as to citizens of those countries. His remarkable works for humanity have greatly inspired thousands of people to lead a good life and make a difference in their community and country. With the motto “Toward the peaceful state of Nirvana,” the Venerable Sayadaw Ashin Pin Nya Tha Mi continues to write books and articles while practicing and teaching meditation.
