= List of Sāsana Azani recipients =

The Burmese government recognizes Buddhist monks who have successfully passed the Tipitakadhara Tipitakakovida Selection Examinations as "Sāsana Azani" (သာသနာ့အာဇာနည်), from Pali Sāsanājāneyya (lit. 'Noble Hero of the Buddhist doctrine'). Since the examination's initial inception in 1948, only 15 monks have been recognized as "Sāsana Azani" as of 2020. Sasana Azani monks are bestowed the following titles: Tipiṭakadhara (Bearer of the "Spoken Tipitaka") and Tipiṭakakovida (Bearer of the "Written Tipitaka").

As of 2020, monks recognized as "Sāsana Azani" include:

Common title	Monastic name	Name in Burmese	Location of study	City	Pass year (CE)	Pass year (ME)
Mingun Sayadaw	Vicittasārabhivaṃsa	ဘဒ္ဒန္တဝိစိတ္တသာရဘိဝံသ	Mingun Dhammanāda Monastery	Sagaing	1953	1315
Pakokku Sayadaw	Neminda	ဘဒ္ဒန္တနေမိန္ဒ	Mahāvisutārāma Dhamma Vimāna Monastery	Mawlamyaing	1959	1321
Pyay Sayadaw	Kosalla	ဘဒ္ဒန္တကောသလ္လ	Pañcanikāya Monastery	Yangon	1963	1325
Mahāgandhayon Sayadaw	Sumaṅgalālaṅkāra	ဘဒ္ဒန္တသုမင်္ဂလာလင်္ကာရ	Tipiṭaka Mahāgandhārāma Monastery	Mayangon Township, Yangon	1973	1335
Yaw Sayadaw	Sirindābhivaṃsa	ဘဒ္ဒန္တသိရိန္ဒာဘိဝံသ	Mahāvisuddhārāma Shwegyin Monastery	Bahan Township, Yangon	1984	1346
Yesagyo Sayadaw	Vāyāmindābhivaṃsa	ဘဒ္ဒန္တဝါယာမိန္ဒာဘိဝံသ	Tipiṭaka Mahāgantavaṃsa Nikāya Monastery	East Dagon Township, Yangon	1995	1356
Mawgyun Sayadaw	Sīlakkhandhābhivaṃsa	ဘဒ္ဒန္တသီလက္ခန္ဓာဘိဝံသ	Three Piṭakas Nikāya Monastery	South Dagon Township, Yangon	1999	1361
Myinmu Sayadaw	Vaṃsapālāsaṅkāra	ဘဒ္ဒန္တဝံသပါလာသင်္ကာရ	Tipiṭaka Nikāya Monastery	Sagaing	1999	1361
Myingyan Sayadaw	Gandhamālaṅkāra	ဘဒ္ဒန္တဂန္ဓမာလင်္ကာရ	Tipiṭaka Nikāya Monastery	Sagaing	2000	1362
Sunlun Sayadaw	Sundara	ဘဒ္ဒန္တသုန္ဒရ	Sunlun Guvipassanā Monastery	Thingangyun Township, Yangon	2004	1365
Rammāvatī Sayadaw	Indapāla	ဘဒ္ဒန္တဣန္ဒပါလ	Tipiṭaka Nikāya Monastery	Sagaing	2004	1365
Sagaing Sayadaw	Abhijātābhivaṃsa	ဘဒ္ဒန္တအဘိဇာတာဘိဝံသ	Mahāsubodhārāsma Monastery	Sagaing	2010	1371
Butalin Sayadaw	Indacariya	ဘဒ္ဒန္တဣန္ဒစရိယ	Tipiṭaka Nikāya Monastery	Sagaing	2012	1373
Kambhoja Sayadaw	Viriyānanda	ဘဒ္ဒန္တဝိရိယာနန္ဒ	Tipiṭaka Nikāya Monastery	Dagon Township, Yangon	2017	1378
Kyaukpadaung Sayadaw	Paññāvaṃsābhivaṃsa	ဘဒ္ဒန္တပညာဝံသာဘိဝံသ	Tipiṭaka Mahāgantavaṃsa Nikāya Monastery	East Dagon Township, Yangon	2020	1381

== See also ==
- Agga Maha Pandita
- Burmese Buddhist titles
- Monastic examinations
- Monastic schools in Myanmar
- Pāli Canon
- Pariyatti
- Thathanabaing of Burma
- Tipitakadhara Tipitakakovida Selection Examinations
