= Burmese Buddhist titles =

Burmese Buddhist titles (Burmese: သာသနာတော်ဆိုင်ရာ ဘွဲ့တံဆိပ်တော်များ) encompass numerous honorific titles conferred by the Burmese government, to recognize members of the Sangha as well as civilians. These religious titles are conferred annually by the Burmese government, in a special ceremony during the full moon day of Tabaung, at the Uppatasanti Pagoda in Naypyidaw. From 1988 to 2008, the ceremony was held at the Mahāpāsaṇa Cave, near Kaba Aye Pagoda in Yangon.

== History ==
In the pre-colonial era, the Burmese monarchy recognized Buddhist monks and laypersons by bestowing religious titles composed of Pali and native Burmese styles. Sayadaw (ဆရာတော်), which literally means "teacher of royalty," was originally bestowed to monks who had educated the king as monastic teachers or tutors, although its usage grew more commonplace with time.

=== Pagan era ===
During the Pagan Kingdom, several kings awarded religious titles to prominent Buddhist monks.

Reign	Recipient	Title	Remarks
	Dhammadassi Mahāthera	Shin Arahaṃ	
Kyansittha	Saṃghasena	Saṃghasenavara Paṇḍit (သံဃသေနဝရ ပဏ္ဍိတ်)	
	Unnamed	Dhammasenāpati (ဓမ္မသေနာပတိ)	Author of Kārikā
Alaungsithu	Unnamed	Mahāaggapaṇḍita (မဟာအဂ္ဂပဏ္ဍိတ)	Author of Dhātvatthasāra
Narapatisithu	Unnamed	Aggamahāpaṇḍita (အဂ္ဂမဟာပဏ္ဍိတ)	Author of Lokuppattipakāsanī
Kyaswa	Unnamed	Disāpāmokkha (ဒိသာပါမောက္ခ)	Author of Saddanīti

=== Pinya and Innwa eras ===
Reign	Recipient	Title	Remarks
Thihathu	Unnamed	Sīrimahācaturaṅgaba (သီရိမဟာစတုရင်္ဂဗ)	A Pyay-born Minister of Interior
Uzana I of Pinya	Sudhamma	Mahāsāmi (မဟာသာမိ)	
	Dhamma	Laṅkāra (လင်္ကာရ)	
	Mahāsīlavaṃsa	Dhajamahādhammarājāguru (ဓဇမဟာဓမ္မရာဇာဂုရု)	
	Mahāraṭṭhasāra	Mahāsaṃgharājā (မဟာသံဃရာဇာ)	

=== Konbaung era ===
During the Konbaung dynasty, distinguished monks received a suffixed title in the form of Rājaguru (ရာဇဂုရု) or Rājādhirājaguru (ရာဇာဓိရာဇဂုရု). The reign of Mindon Min also saw a liberalization in the usage of Sayadaw as a title, which became widely conferred to accomplished monks, regardless of whether they had personally educated the king. Nowadays, Sayadaw is routinely used as a title for all senior monks.

=== Colonial era ===
From 1915 to 1942, the British colonial government conferred the title Aggamahāpaṇḍita (အဂ္ဂမဟာပဏ္ဍိတ) to 98 monks.

=== Post-independence era ===
In 1948, Burma achieved independence from Great Britain. From 1951 through 1953, the Burmese government awarded the Aggamahāpaṇḍita title to 15 monks. From March to July 1953, the government convened a special committee to establish a new system of religious titles. The new system, which included titles for monks and civilians, was introduced on 28 July 1953:

1. Clerical religious titles
  1. Aggamahāpaṇḍita
  2. Abhidhajamahāraṭṭhaguru (အဘိဓဇမဟာရဋ္ဌဂုရု)
2. Civilian religious titles
  1. Pyinna Kyaw (ပညာကျော်)
  2. Paññābala (ပညာဗလ)
  3. Mahāpaññābala (မဟာပညာဗလ)

Following the Sixth Buddhist council and introduction of the Tipiṭakadhara examinations, a new series of titles recognizing academic merit, was introduced by the government. Mingun Sayadaw, in 1953, became the first recipient of the newly minted Tipiṭakadhara Dhammabhaṇḍāgārika (တိပိဋကဓရ ဓမ္မဘဏ္ဍာဂါရိက) title.

During the socialist era from 1978 to 1988, the system of civilian titles was abolished altogether. The practice of conferring Buddhist titles to civilians was reinstated on 24 May 1991 by the State Law and Order Restoration Council, which added 20 new religious titles, including 3 scholarly titles, 4 domestic and international religious propagation titles, and 4 civilian titles for men, and 4 for women.

Monks who pass selective monastic examinations organised by two private organisations are granted a monastic title, -bhivaṃsa (ဘိဝံသ, lit. 'noble lineage'), which is suffixed to their monastic name (e.g., Ashin Nandamalabhivamsa).

== Modern-day system ==
On 17 June 2015, the Office of the President of Myanmar issued a directive amending the existing system of Buddhist titles recognized by the government. The system is divided into 7 categories, outlined below:

1. Pariyatti titles
  1. Abhidhajamahāraṭṭhaguru (အဘိဓဇမဟာရဋ္ဌဂုရု)
  2. Aggamahāpaṇḍita (အဂ္ဂမဟာပဏ္ဍိတ)
2. Tipiṭakadhara Dhammabhaṇḍāgārika (တိပိဋကဓရ ဓမ္မဘဏ္ဍာဂါရိက)
3. Academic instruction titles
  1. Aggamahāganthavācakapaṇḍita (အဂ္ဂမဟာဂန္ထဝါစကပဏ္ဍိတ)
  2. Mahāganthavācakapaṇḍita (မဟာဂန္ထဝါစကပဏ္ဍိတ)
  3. Ganthavācakapaṇḍita (ဂန္ထဝါစကပဏ္ဍိတ)
4. Dhammakatika titles
  1. Mahādhammakatika Bahujanahitadhara (မဟာဓမ္မကထိက ဗဟုဇနဟိတဓရ)
  2. Dhammakatika Bahujanahitadhara (ဓမ္မကထိက ဗဟုဇနဟိတဓရ)
5. Religious propagation titles
  1. Abhidhajaaggamahāsaddhammajotika (အဘိဓဇအဂ္ဂမဟာသဒ္ဓမ္မဇောတိက)
  2. Aggamahāsaddhammajotikadhaja (အဂ္ဂမဟာသဒ္ဓမ္မဇောတိကဓဇ)
  3. Mahāsaddhammajotikadhaja (မဟာသဒ္ဓမ္မဇောတိကဓဇ)
  4. Saddhammajotikadhaja (သဒ္ဓမ္မဇောတိကဓဇ)
6. Kammapaṭṭhana titles
  1. Aggamahākammaṭṭhānācariya (အဂ္ဂမဟာကမ္မဋ္ဌာနာစရိယ)
  2. Mahākammaṭṭhānācariya (မဟာကမ္မဋ္ဌာနာစရိယ)
  3. Kammaṭṭhānācariya (ကမ္မဋ္ဌာနာစရိယ)
7. Sāsanānuggaha titles
  1. Aggamahāsīrisudhammamaṇijotadhara (အဂ္ဂမဟာသီရိသုဓမ္မမဏိဇောတဓရ)
  2. Aggamahāsīrisudhammasiṅgī (အဂ္ဂမဟာသီရိသုဓမ္မသိင်္ဂီ)
  3. Sīrisudhammamaṇijotadhara (သီရိသုဓမ္မမဏိဇောတဓရ)
  4. Sīrisudhammasiṅgī (သီရိသုဓမ္မသိင်္ဂီ)
  5. Sīhasudhammamaṇijotadhara (သီဟသုဓမ္မမဏိဇောတဓရ)
  6. Sīhasudhammasiṅgī (သီဟသုဓမ္မသိင်္ဂီ)
  7. Sudhammamaṇijotadhara (သုဓမ္မမဏိဇောတဓရ)
  8. Sudhammasiṅgī (သုဓမ္မသိင်္ဂီ)

== See also ==
- Agga Maha Pandita
- Buddhism in Myanmar
- List of Sāsana Azani recipients
- Mahanayaka
- Sangharaja
- Sayadaw
- State Saṅgha Mahā Nāyaka Committee
- Thathanabaing of Burma
- Tipitakadhara Tipitakakovida Selection Examinations
