= Chanmyay Sayadaw =

Burmese Theravada Buddhist monk (1928–2026)

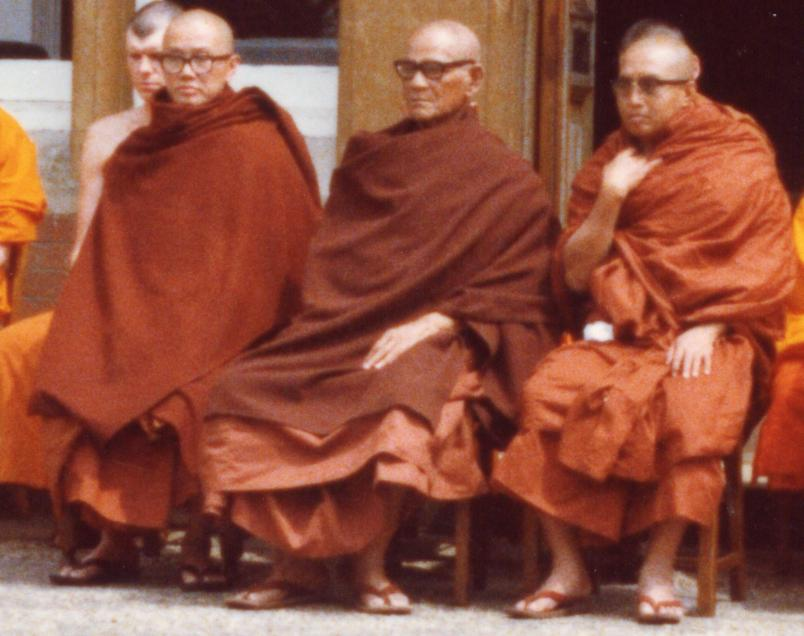
- Chanymyay Sayādaw (right) seated with Mahāsi Sayādaw (centre) at Oakenholt Buddhist Centre in June 1979
- Title: Sayadaw

Personal life
- Born: 24 July 1928 Taungdwingyi Township, Magway Province, Burma Province, British India
- Died: 18 September 2026 (aged 98) Yangon, Myanmar
- Website: chanmyaysayadaw.org

Religious life
- Religion: Buddhism
- School: Theravada
- Lineage: Mahasi
- Dharma name: Janakābhivaṃsa ဇနကာဘိဝံသ

Senior posting
- Teacher: Mahasi Sayadaw
- Based in: Yangon

The Venerable Chanmyay Sayadaw U Janakābhivaṃsa (Burmese: ချမ်းမြေ့ဆရာတော် ဦးဇနကာဘိဝံသ, pronounced [tɕʰáɰ̃mjḛ sʰəjàdɔ̀ ú za̰nəkàbḭwʊ̀ɰ̃θa̰]; 24 July 1928 – 19 September 2026) was a Burmese Theravada Buddhist monk.

== Biography ==
=== Early life and studies ===
Sayadaw was born in Pyinma village, Taungdwingyi Township, Burma Province, British India, on Tuesday, 24 July 1928. His parents were U Phyu Min and Daw Shwe Yee. He started to study the Buddhist scriptures at the age of fifteen as a novice monk. He received the higher upasampada ordination in 1947 and continued advanced studies of Buddhist scriptures. He practised Vipassana meditation under the instruction of the most Venerable Mahasi Sayadaw from 1953 to 1954. He was then invited by the State Buddha Sasana Organization to be an editor of the Buddhist scriptures in Pali for reciting Buddhist scriptures at the Sixth Buddhist Council in Myanmar.

Starting from 1957, the Venerable Sayadaw spent six years in Colombo, Sri Lanka, where he continued his studies of English, Sanskrit, Hindi and Sinhalese languages. He returned to Myanmar in June 1963. At the invitation of the state Buddha Sasana Organisation, he took up residence at Kaba-Aye where he edited the publications of Pali Texts.

=== Teaching career ===
In 1967, he was appointed by the Venerable Mahasi Sayadaw as a meditation teacher at Mahasi Sasana Yeiktha, Yangon. In 1977 Sayadaw Ashin Janakabhivamsa took up residence at Chanmyay Yeiktha Meditation Center which was donated to him by some devotees and became the abbot of the center. Following this he became well known as Chanmyay Sayadaw.

In 1979–1980, Chanmyay Sayadaw accompanied the Mahasi Sayadaw's Dhamma Mission to Europe and the USA. He has undertaken many Dhamma missions to countries in Asia, Europe, and the United States. As late as July 2015, at the age of 87, he travelled to the UK, Ireland, and Canada giving Dhamma talks.

=== Death ===
Sayadaw died from pneumonia on 19 September 2026, at the age of 98.

== Sources ==
- Biography of Chanmyay Sayadaw
