= Agga Maha Pandita =

Burmese Buddhist title

Aggamahāpaṇḍita (Burmese: အဂ္ဂမဟာပဏ္ဍိတ, pronounced [ʔɛʔɡa̰ məhà pàɰ̃dḭta̰]) is an honorific Burmese Buddhist title conferred by the Myanmar government to distinguished Theravada Buddhist monks.

== Etymology ==
Aggamahāpandiṭa, meaning "foremost great and wise one," is derived from the following Pali terms:

- Agga, from Aggasāvaka (အဂ္ဂသာဝက), which was conferred by the Buddha to his foremost disciples, Sariputta and Mahamoggallana.
- Mahā, meaning "great."
- Paṇḍita, meaning "wise or learned person," and denoting possession of wisdom and knowledge of Tipitaka.

== Qualifications ==
The title is usually awarded to Buddhist monks who are highly proficient in teaching the Dhamma or those who are believed to be enlightened (arahants). The title is awarded annually in January by the head of the Burmese government, following after rigorous and subtle examination of a monk's wisdom and achievement by the State Sangha Maha Nayaka Committee.

Recipients must meet the following qualifications:

- Possesses the Aggamahāganthavācakapaṇḍita title
- Has at least 40 years (vassa) in the monkhood
- Is an morally upright person (sīlavanta)
- Has passed the Dhammācariya examination
- Expert writer of Pali commentaries and Pali texts
- Expert teacher of Pali commentaries and Pali texts
- Serves as an abbot for a monastic college (ပရိယတ္တိစာသင်တိုက်)
- Commands authority and influence among Sangha disciples
- Free of accusations and disputes

== History ==
Historically, the Buddha had disciples who held title of Aggasāvaka and Mahāsāvaka who were already enlightened Ariyas and regarded as leaders of the communities of monks known as the Sangha.

From 1915 to 1942, the British colonial government conferred the title Aggamahāpaṇḍita (အဂ္ဂမဟာပဏ္ဍိတ) to 98 monks. From 1951 through 1953, the Burmese government awarded the Aggamahāpaṇḍita title to 15 monks.

== List of recipients ==
- Ledi Sayadaw (1911, Title offered by the Government of India)
- Ashin Janakabhivamsa (1948)
- Mahasi Sayadaw (1952)
- Ambalangoda Polwatte Buddhadatta Thera (1954)
- Balangoda Ananda Maitreya Thero (1955)
- Sayadaw U Thittila (1956)
- Anisakhan Sayadaw U Pandita
- Mogok Sayadaw U Vimala (1962)
- Mingun Sayadaw U Vicittasarabhivamsa (1979)
- Myaungmya Sayadaw U Nyanika (1991)
- Birmingham Sayadaw U Rewatadhamma (2000)
- Sitagu Sayadaw Ashin Nyanissara (1996)
- Sayadaw U Silananda (1993)
- Madihe Pannaseeha Thero (1996)
- Sayadaw U Pannavamsa (1998)
- Walpola Rahula Thero (1998)
- Yaykyi Mingala Kyaungtaik Sayadaw, Bhaddanta Indobhasa (1991)
- Kotugoda Dhammawasa Thero
- Dodampahala Chandrasiri Thero
- Henepola Gunarathana Thero
- Thirikunamale Ananda Thero (2022)
- Gyanashree Mahathero (2023)

== See also ==
- Burmese Buddhist titles
- List of Sāsana Azani recipients
- Mahanayaka
- Monastic examinations
- Sangharaja
- Sayadaw
- Tipitakadhara Tipitakakovida Selection Examinations
