= Monastic examinations =

Yearly examinations for potential entrants into Buddhist monkhood and lay scholars

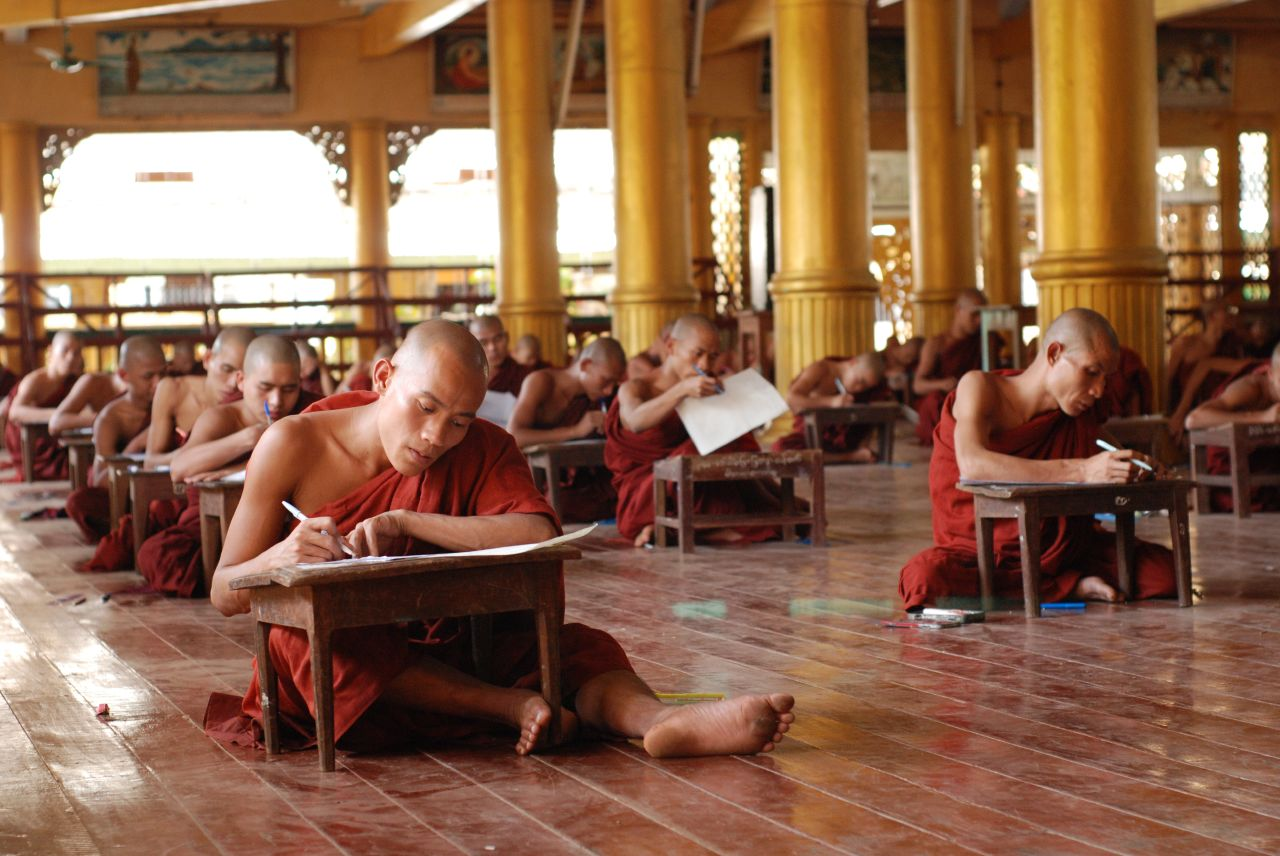
Monastic examinations in Bago

In Theravāda Buddhism, monastic examinations comprise the annual examination system used in Myanmar (Burma) and Thailand to rank and qualify members of the Buddhist sangha, or community of Buddhist monks. Furthermore, certain variations of these examinations are also designed for laypeople who wish to study Buddhist teachings more profoundly.

In Myanmar, the institution of monastic examinations first began in 1648 during pre-colonial era, and the legacy continues today, with modern-day examinations largely conducted by the Ministry of Religious Affairs's Department of Religious Affairs. Educational qualifications have increasingly become important to advance in the monkhood – rural monastic abbots need to have passed at least an intermediate-level monastic examination, while their urban counterparts need to have passed advanced-level exam or higher.

In Thailand, the "Nak Thamm" (Dhamma Studies) examination system is the formal, national curriculum and evaluation method for Buddhist monastic education. The foundation of this system traces back to the 19th-century monastic reforms initiated by King Mongkut (Rama IV) during his time as the ordained monk Bhikkhu Vajirañāṇo. However, the structured examination framework itself was formally established by his son, Supreme Patriarch Prince Vajirañāṇavarorasa. Designed to make the study of Buddhist teachings and monastic discipline more accessible by utilizing the Thai language rather than traditional Pali, the system has grown into a comprehensive three-tier curriculum. Today, centrally administered by the Office of the Sanam Luang Dhamma Examination, the Royal Dhamma Studies Office, Nak Thamm remains the primary standard for educating and qualifying members of the Thai sangha, with an adapted version known as ''Thamma Seuksa'' broadly available for laypeople.

== Myanmar examinations ==
=== History ===
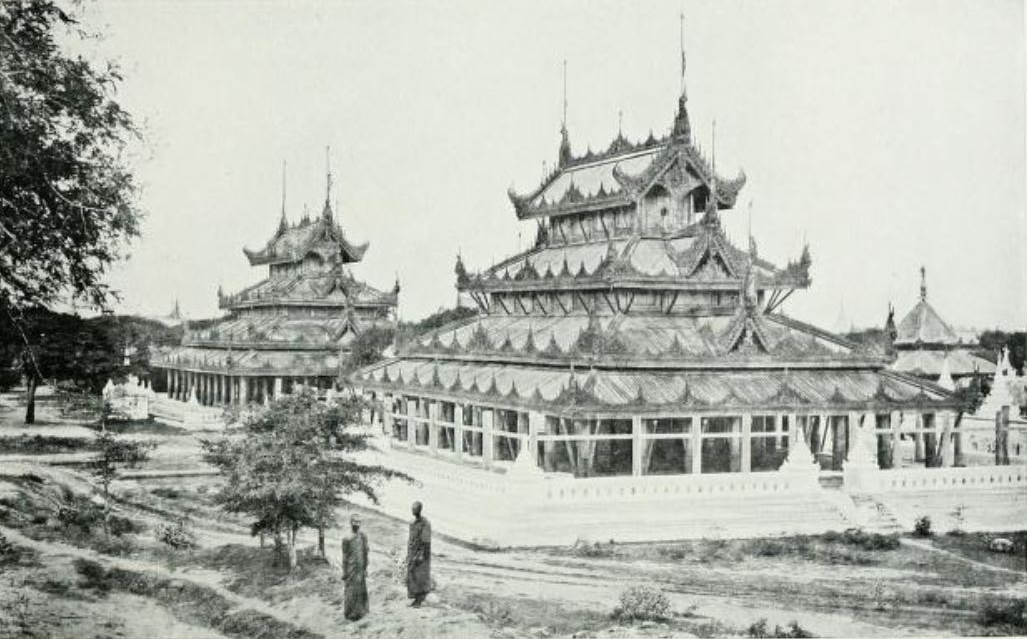
Pathamabyan Examination Hall in Mandalay

The institution of monastic examinations date to the pre-colonial era. Burmese monarchs used these examinations to encourage the study of Pali, the liturgical language of Theravada Buddhism. Successful candidates were rewarded with royal recognition, titles and ranks, and monastic residences.

The pathamabyan examinations began in 1648 during the rule of King Thalun of the Taungoo Dynasty. King Bodawpaya of the Konbaung Dynasty standardised the existing set of examinations, and introduced new ones related to the Vinaya.

This system temporarily lapsed following the demise of the Konbaung Dynasty in 1886, but was revived by the colonial Directorate of Public Instruction to encourage theological and secular education in Burmese monasteries. After a few years of resistance by the Burmese sangha, the first series of colonially-administered examinations was successfully launched in June 1895. They were held annually in Mandalay, Rangoon, and Moulmein. Successful candidates were certified as pathamagyaw.

=== Government examinations ===
Monastic examinations are divided into multiple grades, based on level of difficulty. Monks that pass each succeeding examination are eligible to sit for the next highest-level examination. Monastic exams are held during the Burmese month of Nayon. Examination content is drawn from Buddhist texts (e.g., Abhidhamma Pitaka, Vinaya, and Sutta Pitaka). Questions require candidates to replicate passages from memory, to analyse specific text, and to correct Pali grammar.

==== Thamanegyaw examinations ====
Novice monks (sāmaṇera), who are under the age of 20 and by virtue of their age, have not yet received full ordination, are eligible to sit for thamanegyaw (သာမဏေကျော်) examinations, which are administered by the monasteries in which the novice monks reside, between the months of October and January. The overall examination has three grades, and test knowledge of Buddhist scriptures, the Vinaya, Pali grammar, and the Jataka tales. Memorisation of over 5,000 pages of text is required to pass the written and oral components, and the annual pass rate is under 13%. Novice monks who pass the exam are awarded the monastic title "-laṅkāra" (လင်္ကာရ), which is suffixed to the monk's monastic name.

==== Pathamabyan examinations ====
The Pahtamabyan (ပထမပြန်စာမေးပွဲ) examinations, the lowest-level series of examinations, comprise three exams, from lowest to highest difficulty:

1. Pathamange examination (ပထမငယ်စာမေးပွဲ)
2. Pathamalat examination (ပထမလတ်စာမေးပွဲ)
3. Pathamagyi examination (ပထမကြီးစာမေးပွဲ)

Candidates who rank first on the Pathamagyi examination are known as pathamagyaw (ပထမကျော်).

==== Dhammācariya examinations ====
The Dhammācariya examinations (ဓမ္မာစရိယစာမေးပွဲ), the mid-level series of examinations. Candidates for these examinations are required to pass all three components of the Pathamabyan examinations. The examinations are held over the course of nine days, including six days covering the base texts, one day covering Burmese language texts, and two days for Pali language texts.

Successful candidates are bestowed the monastic title of "Dhammācariya" (Pali for "teacher of the Dharma").

==== Tipiṭakadhara and Tipiṭakakovida examinations ====
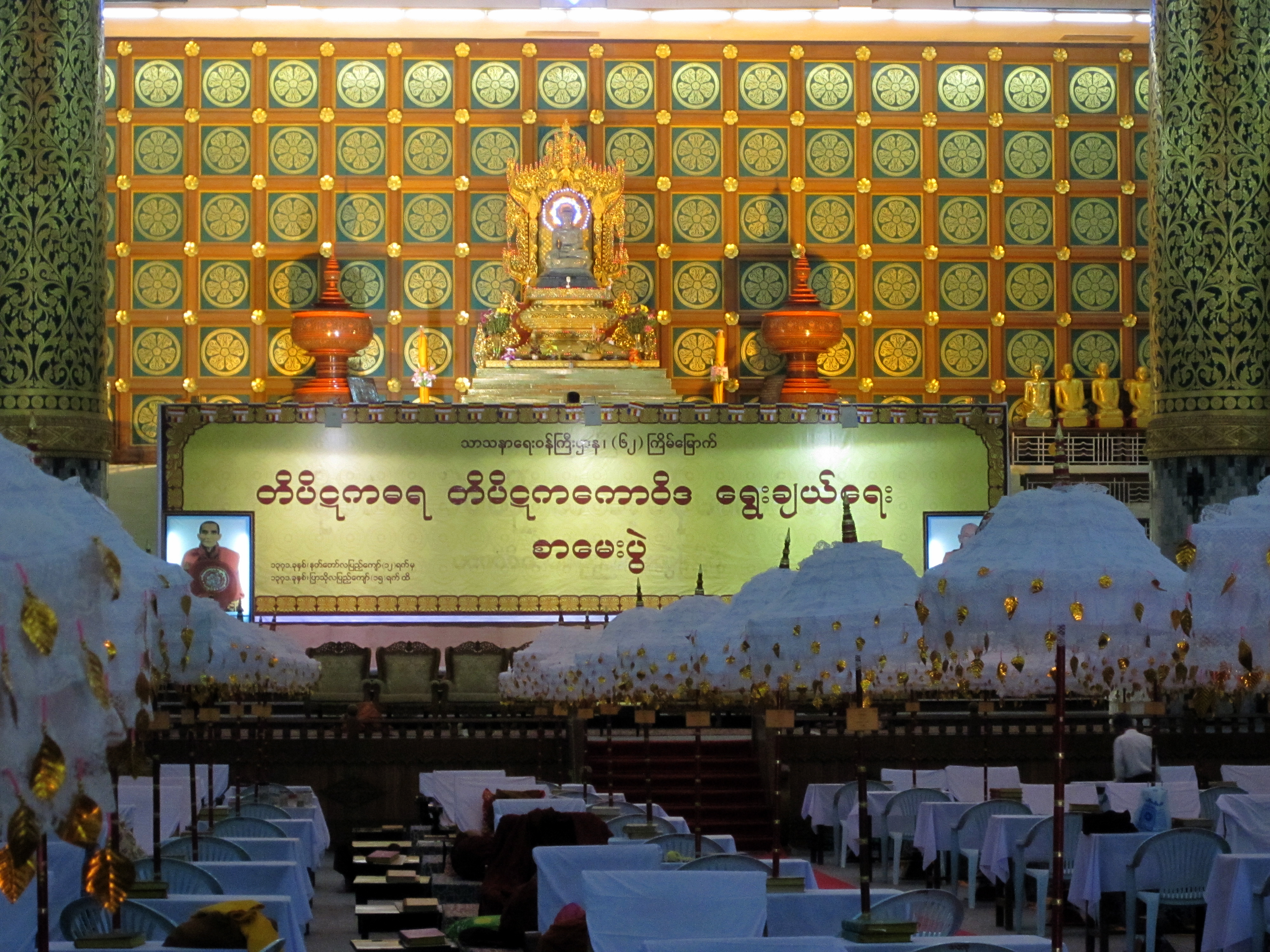
Mahāpāsāṇa Guha Cave hosts the Tipitakadhara Tipitakakovida Examinations

The Tipiṭakadhara and Tipiṭakakovida examinations (တိပိဋကဓရ တိပိဋကကောဝိဒ ရွေးချယ်ရေးစာမေးပွဲ), held since 1948, are the highest-level examinations conducted by the Burmese government. These examinations, require candidates to demonstrate rote memory and comprehension of the entire Pāli Canon and its relevant commentaries, sub-commentaries, and treatises. The oral (Tipiṭakadhara) and written (Tipiṭakakovida) components are held annually in December, over the course of 33 days at the Kaba Aye Pagoda's Mahāpāsāṇa Cave in Yangon.

The breadth of the examinations requires candidates to recite over 2.4 million words with correct pronunciation and smooth flow, and transcribe over 200 texts from memory. The examinations also require candidates to display their mastery of "doctrinal understanding, textual discrimination, taxonomic grouping and comparative philosophy of Buddhist doctrine."

The first candidate to pass the grueling examinations was Mingun Sayadaw in 1954. His error-free performance across 16,000 pages, was rewarded by the Burmese government with the title "Mahātipiṭakadharatipiṭakakovida" (lit. 'great bearer of the spoken and written Tipiṭaka'). As of 2020, only 15 monks have passed both the oral and written components, who are recognised by the Burmese government as "Sāsana Azani" (from Pali Sāsanājāneyya, lit. 'Noble Hero of the Buddhist doctrine'). Successful candidates are bestowed ranking titles, flagstaffs, and white silken kanekgadan umbrellas (ကနက္ကဒဏ်ထီးဖြူတော်) depending on their relative performance.

=== Private examinations ===
Two monastic organisations in Burma also conduct annual Dhammacariya examinations, including the Sakyasīha Examination (သကျသီဟ) sponsored by Mandalay's Pariyatti Sasana Association, and the Cetiyaṅgaṇa Examination (စေတိယင်္ဂဏ ပရိယတ္တိ ဓမ္မာနုဂ္ဂဟ စာလျှောက်မေးပွဲ) sponsored by the Board of Trustees of Shwedagon Pagoda. Monks who pass these examinations are bestowed a monastic title, -bhivaṃsa (ဘိဝံသ, lit. 'noble lineage'), which is suffixed to their monastic name (e.g., Ashin Nandamalabhivamsa).

These examinations, which test monks' knowledge of Buddhist scriptures and analytical thinking, are highly regarded by Buddhist laity in Myanmar, and consists of two stages, the first of which must be passed by the age of 27 and the second by the age of 35.

Successful candidates of the latter examination are bestowed the Cetiyaṅgaṇa Pariyatti Dhammācariya Gaṇavācaka (စေတိယင်္ဂဏ ပရိယတ္တိ ဓမ္မာစရိယ ဂဏဝါစက) and Cetiyaṅgaṇa Abhivaṃsa (စေတိယင်္ဂဏ အဘိဝံသ) titles. Successful candidates are qualified to sit for the government's Tipitakadhara and Tipitakavida examinations.

=== Monastic titles ===
Candidates successfully passing the Dhammācariya and higher-level examinations are bestowed ranking titles, as listed below (in order of decreasing precedence):

1. Tipiṭakadhara and Tipiṭakakovida examination titles
  1. Dhammabhaṇḍāgārika (ဓမ္မဘဏ္ဍာဂါရိက, "Keeper of the Dhamma Treasure")
  2. Maha Tipiṭakakovida (မဟာတိပိဋကကောဝိဒ, "Great Bearer of the Tipitaka (oral and written)")
  3. Tipiṭakakovida (တိပိဋကကောဝိဒ, "Bearer of the Written Tipitaka")
    1. Abhidhammākovida (အဘိဓမ္မကောဝိဒ)
  4. Tipiṭakadhara (တိပိဋကဓရ, "Bearer of the Spoken Tipitaka")
    1. Abhidhammika (အဘိဓမ္မိက)
  5. Dīghanikāyakovida (ဒီဃနိကာယကောဝိဒ)
  6. Dīghabhāṇaka (ဒီဃဘာဏက)
  7. Vinayakovida (ဝိနယကောဝိဒ)
  8. Vinayadhara (ဝိနယဓရ)
2. Dhammācariya examination titles
  1. Dhammācariya Makuṭiraṃsī (ဓမ္မာစရိယမကုဋရံသီ)
  2. Sāsanadhajadhammācariya Abhidhammā Paḷi Pāragū (သာသနဓဇဓမ္မာစရိယအဘိဓမ္မပါဠိပါရဂူ), Sāsanadhajadhammācariya Dīghanikāya Paḷi Pāragū (သာသနဓဇဓမ္မာစရိယဒီဃနိကာယပါဠိပါရဂူ), and Sāsanadhajadhammācariya Vinaya Paḷi Pāragū (သာသနဓဇဓမ္မာစရိယဝိနယပါဠိပါရဂူ)
  3. Sāsanadhaja Sirīpavaradhammācariya (သာသနဓဇ သိရီပဝရဓမ္မာစရိယ)
  4. Sāsanadhajadhammācariya (သာသနဓဇဓမ္မာစရိယ)

== Thailand examinations ==
The Sanam Luang examination is the national evaluation system used to measure the scriptural knowledge (Pariyatti Dhamma) of the Thai Sangha. Managed by the Office of the Sanam Luang Dhamma Examination, with the approval of the Sangha Supreme Council (Mahatherasamakom), the system is divided into two primary branches: the Pali Department (Phaenaek Pali) and the Dhamma Department (Phaenaek Thamm). Historically, the term Sanam Luang refers to the tradition of conducting examinations within the Royal Palace grounds under royal patronage. While these evaluations were originally conducted as oral examinations—where monastics translated Pali scriptures into Thai in the presence of the King—they have since transitioned into standardized written examinations held at centers nationwide. The Pali Department oversees nine levels of advancement (Prayok 1–9), with the highest level, Prayok 9, officially recognized by the Thai government as equivalent to a bachelor's degree under the Act Determining the Status of Graduates in Buddhist Studies, B.E. 2527 (1984). Successful candidates are frequently honored with monastic titles, royal fans (phat yot), and government stipends (nitayabhat) as a mark of national distinction.

=== History ===
The Dhamma Studies (Nak Thamm) examination system was established by Supreme Patriarch Prince Vajirañāṇavarorasa. His primary goal was to make learning monastic discipline more accessible for monks and novices by utilizing Thai translations instead of traditional Pali. After being appointed abbot of Wat Bowonniwet in 1892, he commenced the writing of Nak Thamm materials to facilitate this new method of religious education.

The examination framework, primarily managed by the Royal Dhamma Studies Office (Thai: สำนักงานแม่กองธรรมสนามหลวง) as the Sanam Luang National Dhamma Studies Examination Curriculum, gained broader popularity starting in 1905. This was driven by new conscription legislation that granted military exemptions to monks, prompting the need for a curriculum to certify that novices also possessed sufficient Dhamma knowledge to qualify for exemption. After receiving royal approval on March 27, 1911, the initial centralized exams took place in October 1911 at three temples: Wat Bowonniwet, Wat Mahathat Yuwaratrangsarit, and Wat Benchamabophit.

By the subsequent year, the syllabus had evolved into its modern four-part structure: Dhamma analysis (dhammavipaaka), the Buddha's life (buddhabravat), essay composition based on Pali proverbs (kae kratoo thamm), and monastic rules (vinai). Additionally, 1913 saw the introduction of a three-tier grading system: elementary (tree) for monks in their first five years of ordination, intermediate (toh) for those ordained between five and ten years, and advanced (ayk) for monks with ten or more vassas. Later, from 1929 onward, the Nak Thamm curriculum was tailored for laypeople under the name thamma seuksa, following the instruction of Supreme Patriarch Somdet Phra Luang Jinavorasirivattana.

=== Pali Sanam Luang curriculum ===
The education in the Pali department, or the Pali Sanam Luang Examination, is categorized into nine levels (ประโยค, Prayok):

- Level 1-2 to Level 3 are classified as Parian Tri (Elementary level). The Ministry of Education recognizes this as equivalent to Lower Secondary Education (Junior High School).
- Level 4 to Level 6 are classified as Parian Tho (Intermediate level). This is recognized as equivalent to Upper Secondary Education (High School).
- Level 7 to Level 9 are classified as Parian Ek (Advanced level). This is recognized as equivalent to a Bachelor's Degree.

The administration of Pali Sanam Luang examinations is currently divided into two sessions. The first session is for Level 6–9, and the second session covers Level 1-2 up to Level 5. All examinations are standardized nationwide using papers issued by the Office of the National Pali Examination Board (Mae Kong Pali). Session 1 is held on the 2nd and 3rd days of the waxing moon in the 3rd lunar month for Level 6–7; and on the 4th, 5th, and 6th days of the waxing moon in the 3rd lunar month for Level 8–9. Session 2 is held on the 10th, 11th, and 12th days of the waning moon in the 3rd lunar month for Level 1-2 up to Level 5.

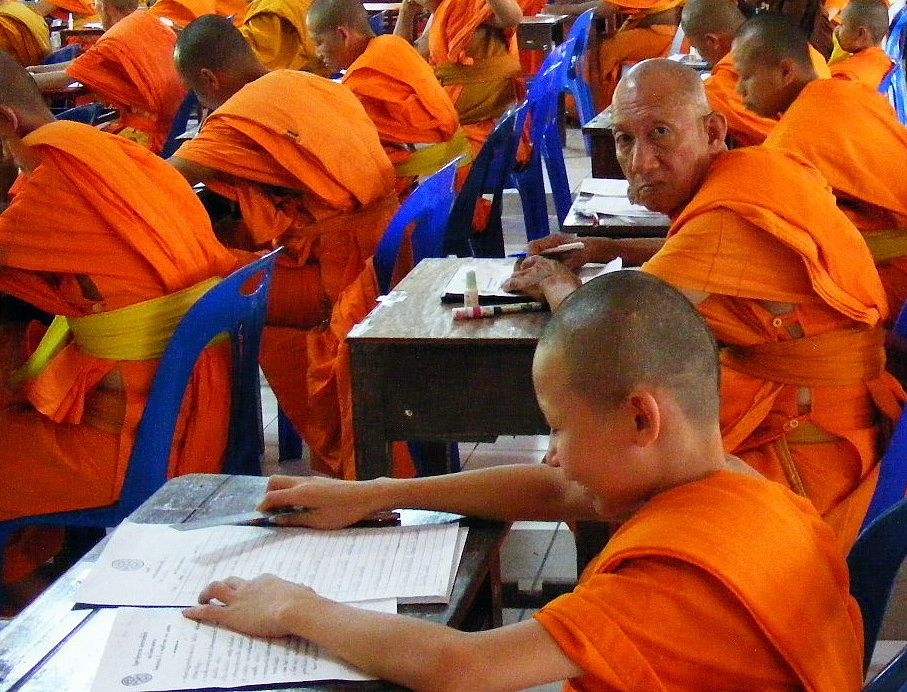
The 2009 annual Sanam Luang Dhamma Examination (2nd session) at the Uttaradit Provincial Primate's monastic school, Wat Khlong Pho examination center.

=== Nak Thamm curriculum ===
The Nak Thamm (Pali: Dhamma) curriculum is specifically designed for the instruction of Buddhist monastics, namely bhikkhus (monks) and sāmaṇeras (novices). The curriculum is divided into three levels of advancement: elementary (tree), intermediate (toh), and advanced (ayk).

==== Nak Thamm Tree examinations ====
The elementary level, Nak Thamm Tree, tests candidates on four main subjects. Candidates must write an essay based on Dhamma proverbs (kae kratoo thamm) using the first volume of Phutthasasanasuphasit. The examination also covers Dhamma analysis (dhammavipaaka) using Dhammavipaaka Volume 1 and Navakovada, as well as the life of the Buddha (buddhabravat) using the texts Buddhabravat and Pathamasambodhikatha. Finally, candidates are tested on monastic discipline (vinai) based on Vinayamukha Volume 1 and Navakovada, along with elementary religious ceremonies (sasanaphithi).

==== Nak Thamm Toh examinations ====
The intermediate level, Nak Thamm Toh, requires examinees to write a connected sermon-style essay on two different Dhamma topics, referencing proverbs from two distinct sources without repetition. The Dhamma analysis component uses the second part of Dhammavipaaka. Candidates also study history (anubuddhabravat) through texts such as Anubuddhabravat, the disciples' histories in Buddhanubuddhabravat, Sangitikatha, and Pathamasambodhi. The monastic discipline section covers Vinayamukha Volumes 1 and 2, alongside intermediate-level religious ceremonies.

==== Nak Thamm Ayk examinations ====
For the advanced level, Nak Thamm Ayk, the essay writing component increases in complexity, requiring examinees to connect three different topics in a sermon style, referencing three distinct, non-repeating sources, using texts like Mangalavisesakatha. Dhamma analysis is based on Dhammavicharana, Samathakammatthana, the Mahasatipatthana Sutta, and the Girimananda Sutta. The history component (buddhanubuddhabravat) comprehensively covers Buddhabravat Volumes 1-3, Pathamasambodhi, Buddhanubuddhabravat, Anubuddhabravat, and Sangitikatha. Lastly, monastic discipline is tested using Vinayamukha Volume 3.

=== Thamma Seuksa curriculum ===
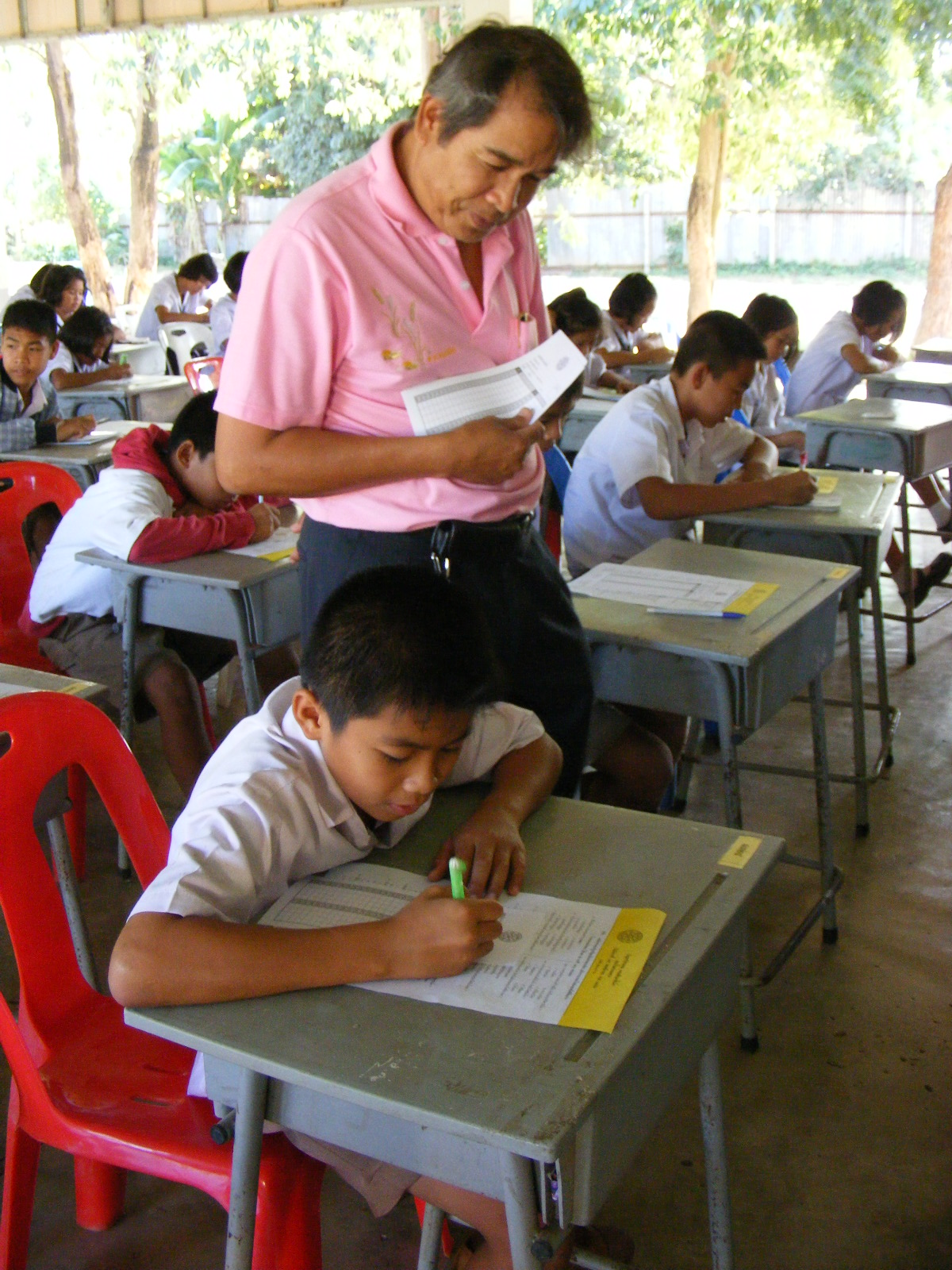
The 2008 annual Sanam Luang Thamma Seuksa Examination at the religious study office of Wat Khung Taphao, Pakhnun Charoenwitthaya School examination center, Uttaradit Province.

The Thamma Seuksa (Pali: Dhamma Sikkhā) curriculum is an adapted version designed for laypeople (kharawat or kharuhat; Pali: gharavasa) who have an interest in Buddhism and the Dhamma-Vinaya. Similar to the monastic system, it is divided into elementary, intermediate, and advanced levels.

==== Thamma Seuksa Tree examinations ====
At the Thamma Seuksa Tree level, lay candidates write an essay on Dhamma proverbs based on Phutthasasanasuphasit Volume 1. They are also tested on Dhamma analysis using Dhammavipaaka Volume 1 and Navakovada, and the life of the Buddha via Buddhabravat and Pathamasambodhikatha. Instead of monastic rules, the discipline section for laypeople covers the Five Precepts (pañcasīla), the Five Virtues (pañcadhamma), and the Uposatha Precepts, along with elementary religious ceremonies.

==== Thamma Seuksa Toh examinations ====
The Thamma Seuksa Toh level mirrors the monastic intermediate essay structure, requiring a sermon-style connection of two topics with two external proverb references. The Dhamma subject utilizes the second part of Dhammavipaaka. The history component uses Anubuddhabravat, the disciples' histories in Buddhanubuddhabravat, Sangitikatha, and Pathamasambodhi. The discipline and ceremony sections focus on intermediate-level Uposatha Precepts and religious practices.

==== Thamma Seuksa Ayk examinations ====
For Thamma Seuksa Ayk, the advanced lay examination, the essay component requires connecting three topics with three external references. The Dhamma subject covers Dhammavicharana, Samathakammatthana, the Mahasatipatthana Sutta, and the Girimananda Sutta. Candidates study history using Buddhabravat Volumes 1-3, Pathamasambodhi, Buddhanubuddhabravat, Anubuddhabravat, and Sangitikatha. The discipline section is dedicated to advanced-level Uposatha Precepts.

=== Examination dates ===
The schedule for these examinations is determined by the Thai lunar calendar. The testing period is divided into two distinct phases for monastics. The first period, designated for the Nak Thamm Tree examination, is scheduled annually from the 9th to the 12th waxing moon of the 11th lunar month. The second period, for the intermediate and advanced Nak Thamm Toh and Ayk levels, takes place from the 2nd to the 5th waning moon of the 12th lunar month. For laypeople taking the Thamma Seuksa examinations, the tests are typically held around the 7th waning moon of the 12th lunar month.

== See also ==
- Abhidhajamahāraṭṭhaguru
- Agga Maha Pandita
- Burmese Buddhist titles
- List of Sāsana Azani recipients
- Monastic schools in Myanmar
- Pāli Canon
- Pariyatti
- Phaungdawoo Monastic Education High School
- Pirivena (Sri Lanka)
- Sanam Luang Dhamma Studies (Thailand)
- Tipiṭakadhara Dhammabhaṇḍāgārika
- Tipitakadhara Tipitakakovida Selection Examinations
