= Tipitakadhara Dhammabhandagarika =

Burmese Buddhist title

Tipiṭakadhara Dhammabhaṇḍāgārika (Burmese: တိပိဋကဓရ ဓမ္မဘဏ္ဍာဂါရိက) is an honorific Burmese Buddhist title conferred by the government of Myanmar to the Buddhist monks who have passed five years since completing all levels of Tipitakadhara Tipitakakovida Selection Examinations in accordance with the provision No. 37/2010 of the State Peace and Development Council. The awardees are annually announced on 4 January, the Independence Day of Myanmar.

== Qualifications ==
According to the section 6 (A) of the Provisions on the Religious Titles promulgated on 17 June 2015, a recipient must meet the following qualifications:

1. Have been conferred the title of Tipitakadhara for his memorization the Tipitaka
2. Have been conferred the title of Tipitakakovida for being able to deal with difficult matters on Tipitaka
3. Five years had passed since the title of Tpitakadhara Tipitakakovida have been conferred
4. Be fully endowed with morality, fairness and wisdom

== Recipients ==
As of 2023, there are 14 sayadaws who have been offered the title.

1. Ashin Vicittasārābhivaṃsa
2. Ashin Neminda
3. Ashin Kosalla
4. Ashin Sumaṅgalālaṅkāra
5. Ashin Sīrindābhivaṃsa
6. Ashin Vāyāmindābhivaṃsa
7. Ashin Sīlakkhandhābhivaṃsa
8. Ashin Vaṃsapālālaṅkāra
9. Ashin Gandhamālālaṅkāra
10. Ashin Sunada
11. Ashin Indapāla
12. Ashin Abhijātābhivaṃsa
13. Ashin Indācariya
14. Ashin Viriyānanda
