= Gyanashree Mahathero =

Bangladeshi Buddhist guru (1925–2025)

Sangharaja Saddharmaditya Srimat Gyanashree Mahathero
- জ্ঞানশ্রী মহাথের
- Born: 18 November 1925; Chittagong District, Bengal Presidency, British India
- Died: 13 November 2025 (aged 99); Chittagong, Bangladesh
- Occupation: Buddhist Monk
- Years active: 1944–2025
- Parents: Prem lal Barua (father); Menoka Bala Barua (mother)
- Awards: See full list

Gyanashree Mahathero (18 November 1925 – 13 November 2025) was a Bangladeshi Buddhist monk. The government of Bangladesh awarded him the Ekushey Padak in 2022 for his significant contribution to social service.

== Biography ==
Gyanashree Mahathero was born on 18 November 1925 in the village of Domkhali, North Gujra, Raozan, Chittagong District. He stayed at Nandankanan Buddhist Monastery in the Chittagong Hill Tracts from 1958 onwards.

Mahathero became a samanera in 1944 and a monk in 1949. He studied till the entrance. He took the initiative to spread the economic, social, religious and educational life of the Buddhist common people in the Chittagong Hill Tracts. He established many religious and educational institutions in the hilly and plain areas. In 1974, he set up a monastery, where residential schools were set up to provide general education to poor, orphaned and helpless children in Buddhist communities. He established several Buddhist educational centres at Joypurhat and Rangpur.

Mahathero died at Evercare Hospital in Chittagong, on 13 November 2025, five days before his 100th birthday.

== Awards ==
- Ekushey Padak (2022)
- Aggamahāpaṇḍita (2023)
