= Ashin Dhammasāmi =

Burmese Buddhist scholar monk

Dhammasāmi
- အရှင်ဓမ္မသာမိ
- Title: Sayadaw

Personal life
- Born: 1964 (age 61–62) Shan State, Burma
- Education: Sasana Mandaing Pali University; Buddhist and Pali University of Sri Lanka; University of Kelaniya; University of Oxford
- Occupation: Buddhist monk

Religious life
- Religion: Buddhism
- School: Theravada
- Monastic name: Dhammasāmi ဓမ္မသာမိ

Ashin Khammai Dhammasāmi (Burmese: အရှင်ဓမ္မသာမိ, Pali: Dhammasāmi, born 1964), also known as Oxford Sayadaw, is a prominent Burmese Theravada Buddhist monk. He founded Oxford Buddha Vihara in 2003, where he serves as the abbot. He also serves as the Buddhist chaplain to Oxford University, a member of the Oxford Council of Faith, a fellow of Oxford Centre for Buddhist Studies, and a world council member for Religions for Peace. He is the founder of the Shan State Buddhist University in Taunggyi.

== Early life and education ==
Dhammasāmi was born in 1964 in Naungpan village, Lecha Township, Shan State, Burma (now Myanmar). He was ordained as a samanera at the age of six, and was ordained as a Buddhist monk at the age of 19. In 2004, he obtained a PhD at Oxford University.

== Missions and works ==
In 2014, He founded the Shan State Buddhist University, Taunggyi, Shan State, Myanmar.
