= Polwatte Buddhadatta Thera =

Agga Maha Pandita Polwatte Buddhadatta Thera
- Most.Ven Polwatte Buddhadatta Thera

Personal life
- Born: 1887 Sri Lanka
- Died: 1962 (aged 74–75) Sri Lanka

Religious life
- Religion: Buddhism
- School: Theravada
- Dharma name: Ven. Polwatte Buddhadatta Thera

Senior posting
- Teacher: Theravada Buddhist monk and professor of Buddhist philosophy at Vidyalankara University

The Venerable Ambalangoda Polwatte Buddhadatta Mahanayake Thera (A. P. Buddhadatta) (1887–1962) was a Theravada Buddhist monk and a professor of Buddhist philosophy at Vidyalankara University. During 1928 he travelled to Switzerland to teach Pāli but found no suitable students.

In 1954, he was the first Sri Lankan monk to be awarded as the Agga Maha Pandita by Burma (Myanmar). He wrote several books on Pali language, and was a member of the inaugural staff of Nalanda College, Colombo and a member of the Ananda College staff.

== Works ==
- Concise Pali-English Dictionary (1957)
- Pali Sahithya (1962)
- Oalibhasappawesaniya (Pali grammar teacher in Burmese - 1908)
- Pali Nigandu (Burmese - English word builder for Pali words- 1908)
- Buddhagosoppathi Pali book translated to Burmese (1908)
- Bhidhamma Mathruka Swarupaya - Translation from Burmese to Sinhala (1911)
- Pali Basappaweniya -Sinhala Translation (1912)
- Visuddhi Magga Edition (1914)
- Pali Bashawatharanaya 1 (1923)
- Pali Bashawatharanaya 2 (1925)
- Pali Patawali (1926)
- Thribhasha Rathnakaraya (1928)
- Apadhana Pali Edition (1929)
- Pali Bashawatharanaya 3 (1930)
- Pali Wakya Vivechanaya (1933)
- Pali Wakya Rachanawa ha Pariwarthana Parichaya (1947)
- Patamapaatawali (1948)
- Pali -Sinhala Dictionary (1950)
- Winya Winichchaya ha Uththara Winichchaya Edition (1952)
- Thripitaka Suchiya (1953)
- Abhidhammawathara Edition (1954)
- Namarupa Parichcheda Edition (1954)
- Dhammapadhattakatha Edition (1956)
- Jinakalamali Sinhala Translation (1957)
- Namarupa Parichcheda English Edition (1914)
- Abhidhammawathara English Edition (1915)
- Ruparupa Wibhagaya English Edition (1915)
- Sammoha Winodhini English Edition (1923)
- Winaya Winichchaya & Uththara Winichchaya English Edition (1927)
- Niddesa Atuwa (1940)
- New Pali Course 1 (1937)
- New Pali Course 2 (1938)
- Higher Pali Course (1951)
- Aids to Pali Conversation & Translation (1951)

== See also ==
- Thero
