= Shindand (disambiguation) =

Shindand is a city in Herat Province, Afghanistan.

Shindand may also refer to:

- Shindand District, in Herat Province, Afghanistan
- Shindand Air Base, in Shindand, Herat Province, Afghanistan
- Shindand, Pakistan, a small village in the Federally Administered Tribal Areas, Pakistan
