= Abhidhaja Maha Rattha Guru =

Burmese Buddhist monastic title

Abhidhajamahāraṭṭhaguru (Burmese: အဘိဓဇမဟာရဋ္ဌဂုရု, pronounced [ʔəbḭdəza̰ məhà ràʔtʰa̰ gṵrṵ], lit. 'Most eminent great guru of the country') is an honorific Burmese Buddhist title conferred by the government of Myanmar, to the Buddhist monks who have contributed to the pariyatti field. The awardees are annually announced on 4 January, the Independence Day of Myanmar.

The title is equivalent to the Rājaguru (ရာဇဂုရု) or Rājādhirājaguru (ရာဇာဓိရာဇဂုရု) titles which were offered by the Burmese kings to distinguished sayadaws, in the Konbaung period.

== Qualifications ==
According to the section 6 (A) of the Provisions on the Religious Titles promulgated on 17 June 2015, a recipient must meet the following qualifications:

1. Possesses the Aggamahāpaṇḍita title
2. Has at least 60 years (vassas) in the monkhood
3. Has a good general knowledge
4. Has written beneficial works to the Buddha's Sāsana
5. Serves as a chief abbot of a monastic college
6. Commands authority and has influence among Sangha disciples
7. Has been respected by the public for his morals, attitude and wisdom

== Recipients ==
=== 2022 ===
No.	Recipient	Monastery	Location
1.	Bhaddanta Siṭṭhilābhivaṃsa	Minkyaung Monastery	Loikaw, Kayah State
2.	Bhaddanta Narāsabhābhivaṃsa	Vejayantā Monastery	Monyo, Bago Region
3.	Bhaddanta Ñāṇidasāra	Majjimāyon Pāramī Monastery	Yesagyo, Magway Region
4.	Bhaddanta Ñāṇavaṃsa	Htay Monastery	Myingyan, Mandalay Region
5.	Bhaddanta Tikkha	Taung Salin Taikthit Monastery	Chanayethazan, Mandalay Region
6.	Bhaddanta Tilokābhivaṃsa	Ywama Monastery	Insein, Yangon Region
7.	Bhaddanta Jotālaṅkāra	Dakkhiṇāyon Monastery	Mayangon, Yangon Region
8.	Bhaddanta Sumana	Sek-yon Dhammayeiktha Monastery	Kyonemange, Ayeyarwady Region
9.	Somdet Phra Ariyavongsagatanana (Note: 20th Supreme Patriarch of Thailand)	Wat Ratchabophit Sathitmahasimaram Ratchaworawihan	Bangkok, Thailand
10.	Dodampahala Chandrasiri Maha Nayaka Thero	Gothama Thapowanaya	Sri Lanka

=== 2021 ===
No.	Recipient	Monastery	Location
1.	Bhaddanta Sūriya	Mahā Vijjāsippaṃ Monastery	Monywa, Sagaing Region
2.	Bhaddanta Javana	Khamti Monastery	Wuntho, Sagaing Region
3.	Bhaddanta Gandamā	Myoma Monastery	Bago, Bago Region
4.	Bhaddanta Vimalābhivaṃsa	Aungmyaythaya Wunmingyi Monastery	Yesagyo, Magway Region
5.	Bhaddanta Indaka	Nyaunggan Monastery	Chanmyathazi, Mandalay Region
6.	Bhaddanta Tilokābhivaṃsa	Mahānandisenārāma Monastery	Chanmyathazi, Mandalay Region
7.	Bhaddanta Sujanābhivaṃsa	Jayavatī Kyaung, Moegaung Monastery	Chanayethazan, Mandalay Region
8.	Bhaddanta Jotikābhivaṃsa	Ratanābimān Kyaung, Chanthagyi Taung Taik Monastery	Aungmyethazan, Mandalay Region
9.	Dr Bhaddanta Veḷuriya	Minkyaung Monastery	Myittha, Mandalay Region
10.	Dr Bhaddanta Paññāsāmi	Aung Maṅgalā Monastery	Mrauk U, Rakhine State
11.	Bhaddanta Soma	Maṇiratanā Monastery	Sittwe, Rakhine State
12.	Bhaddanta Vāseṭṭha	Pheppin-aing Monastery	Thingangyun, Yangon Region
13.	Bhaddanta Gandhamālābhivaṃsa	Aletawya Sanbya Monastery	Bahan, Yangon Region
14.	Dr Bhaddanta Aṅgisa	Pāḷikārī Monastery	Thaketa, Yangon Region
15.	Bhaddanta Dhammasīri	Naga Hnakaung Monastery	Tachileik, Shan State
16.	Bhaddanta Vissuta	Nigrodhāyon Nyaungbintha Monastery	Pathein, Ayeyarwady Region
17.	Bhaddanta Ñāṇissara	Kushinagar Myanmar Monastery	India

=== 2020 ===
No.	Recipient	Monastery	Location
1.	Bhaddanta Sumana	Panngweyon Tawya Monastery	Madauk, Bago Region
2.	Bhaddanta Cintāsāra	Saṅgārāma Monastery	Magway, Magway Region
3.	Bhaddanta Kelāsa	Chaungdaung Monastery	Myingyan, Mandalay Region
4.	Bhaddanta Aggañāṇābhivṃsa	Sishin Kyaung, Mahā Visuddhāyon Taikthit Monastery	Maha Aungmye, Mandalay Region
5.	Bhaddanta Jotipāla	Myolaekyaung Monastery	Thanbyuzayat, Mon State
6.	Bhaddanta Kovidadhaja	Kyaukkone Tawya Medinī Monastery	Yankin, Yangon Region
7.	Dr Bhaddanta Nandamālābhivaṃsa	International Theravada Buddhist Missionary University	Mayangon, Yangon Region

=== 2019 ===
No.	Recipient	Monastery	Location
1.	Bhaddanta Kavindācāra	Dhammālaṅkāra Hydropower Monastery	Thazi, Mandalay Region
2.	Bhaddanta Canda	Dakkhiṇārāma Monastery	Sittwe, Rakhine State
3.	Bhaddanta Dhammānanda	Sagaing Monastery	Thingangyun, Yangon Region
4.	Bhaddanta Siddhiya	Puññanimmitārāma Shwe Thuwun Monastery	Thingangyun, Yangon Region
5.	Bhaddanta Sumaṅgalābhivṃsa	Maithauk Pathama Monastery	Nyaungshwe, Shan State
6.	Bhaddanta Indavaṃsābhivaṃsa	Shwe Hintha Tawya Monastery	Nyaungdon, Ayeyarwady Region
