= Shindand, Pakistan =

Village in the Federally Administered Tribal Areas, Pakistan

Shindand
- Location within Pakistan
- Coordinates: 33.33°N 71.38°E
- Country: Pakistan
- Province: Federally Administered Tribal Areas
- Elevation: 493 m (1,617 ft)
- Time zone: UTC+5 (PST)

Shindand is a village in the Federally Administered Tribal Areas of Pakistan. It is located at 33°33'0N 71°38'0E with an altitude of 493 metres (1,617 ft).
