= Tipitakadhara Tipitakakovida Selection Examinations =

Highest level Buddhist monastic exam in Myanmar

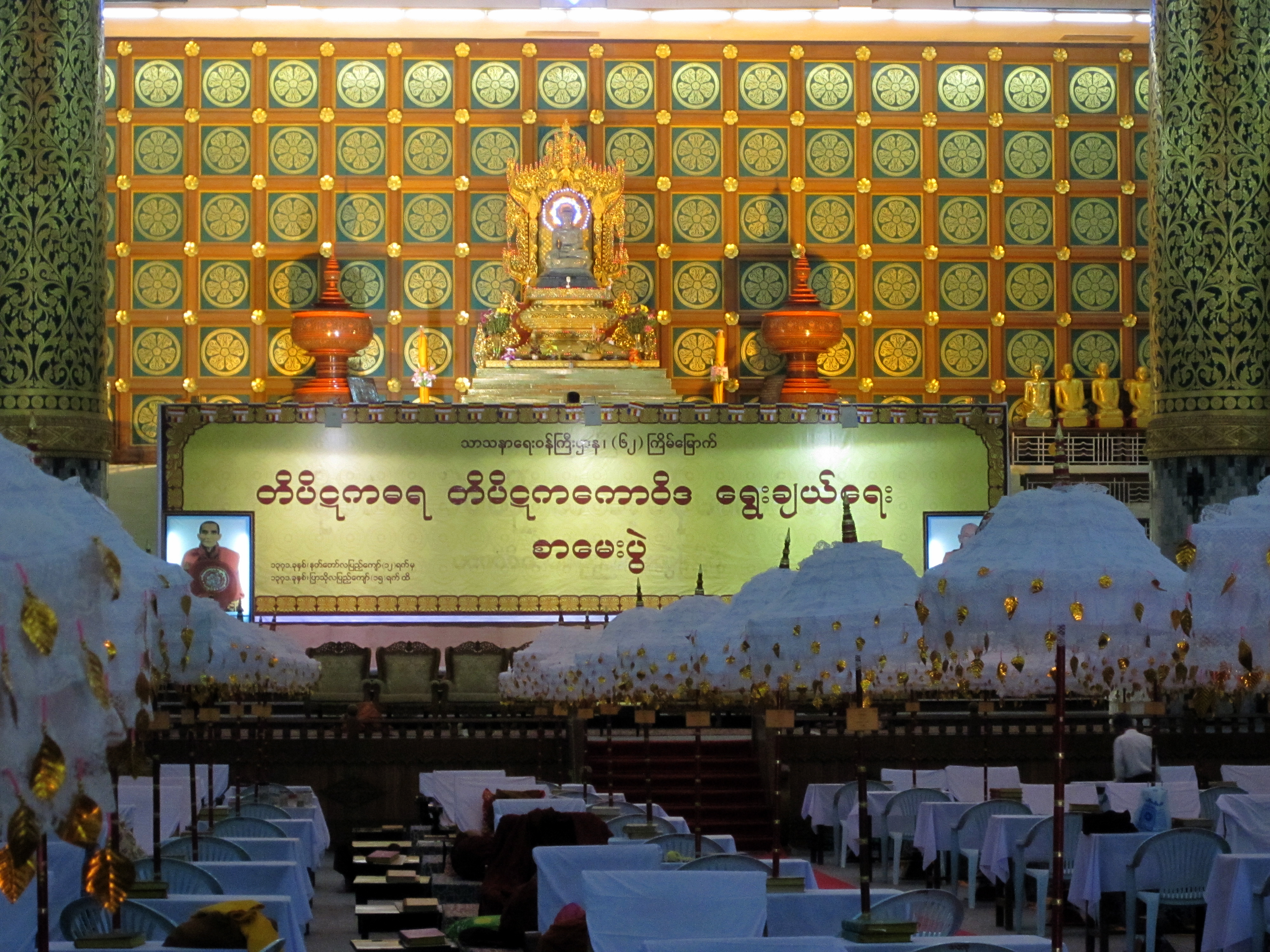
- Tipitakadhara Tipitakakovida Examinations, Mahapasana Guha Cave, Yangon
- Type: Monastic examinations
- Administrator: Tipitakadhara Tipitaka Kovida Selection Examination Board, Ministry of Religious Affairs and Culture (Myanmar)
- Skills tested: five levels of reciting (Tipiṭakadhara) five levels of idea by writing (Tipiṭakakovida)
- Duration: 33 days– from last week of December to third week of January
- Offered: once a year
- Regions: Myanmar
- Languages: Burmese; Pali
- Website: mahana.org.mm dra.gov.mm

The Tipiṭakadhara Tipiṭakakovida Selection Examinations (Burmese: တိပိဋကဓရ တိပိဋကကောဝိဒ ရွေးချယ်ရေး စာမေးပွဲ) are the highest-level monastic examinations held annually in Burma since 1948, organized by the Ministry of Religious Affairs. It tests the candidates' memory of Tripiṭaka (or "Three Baskets") both in oral (five levels) and in written components (five levels). The examinations require candidates to display their mastery of "doctrinal understanding, textual discrimination, taxonomic grouping and comparative philosophy of Buddhist doctrine." A Sayadaw who has passed all levels of the examinations is often referred as the Sutabuddha (lit. 'The Buddha of Knowledge').

== History ==
In order to hold Sixth Buddhist council at Burma in the Buddhist era 2500, the other Theravada five countries asked Burma whether there was the Tripiṭaka reciter in Burma. Therefore, the Burmese government held the Tipiṭakadhara Tipiṭakakovida Selection Examinations since 1948. The examinations are so difficult that no one could pass until 1953. Mingun Sayadaw became the first winner of the exam in 1953, and was appointed the position of Chaṭṭhasaṅgatisajaka (Chief Respondent) to answer the Dhamma questions asked by Mahasi Sayadaw.

== Eligibility criteria ==
To take the examinations, the candidates must be only monks and novices who passed the examinations of Pathamagyi, Vinayavidu level, third level of Thamanaykyaw, or lecturer level of Cetiyangana and Sakyasiha.

== Content ==
=== Recitation ===
The recitation content includes a cumulative 8026 pages of Tripiṭaka:

1. 851 pages from the first two texts of the Vinaya Piṭaka
2. 1409 pages from the second three texts of the Vinaya Piṭaka
3. 779 pages from the three Dīgha Nikāya texts of the Sutta Piṭaka
4. 1390 pages from the first five Abhidharma texts of the Abhidhamma Piṭaka
5. 3597 pages from the second two Abhidhammā texts of the Abhidhamma Piṭaka.

=== Ideology written answer ===
All texts are taken at the oral-based examination plus its relevant commentaries, sub-commentaries, and treatises.

== Procedures ==
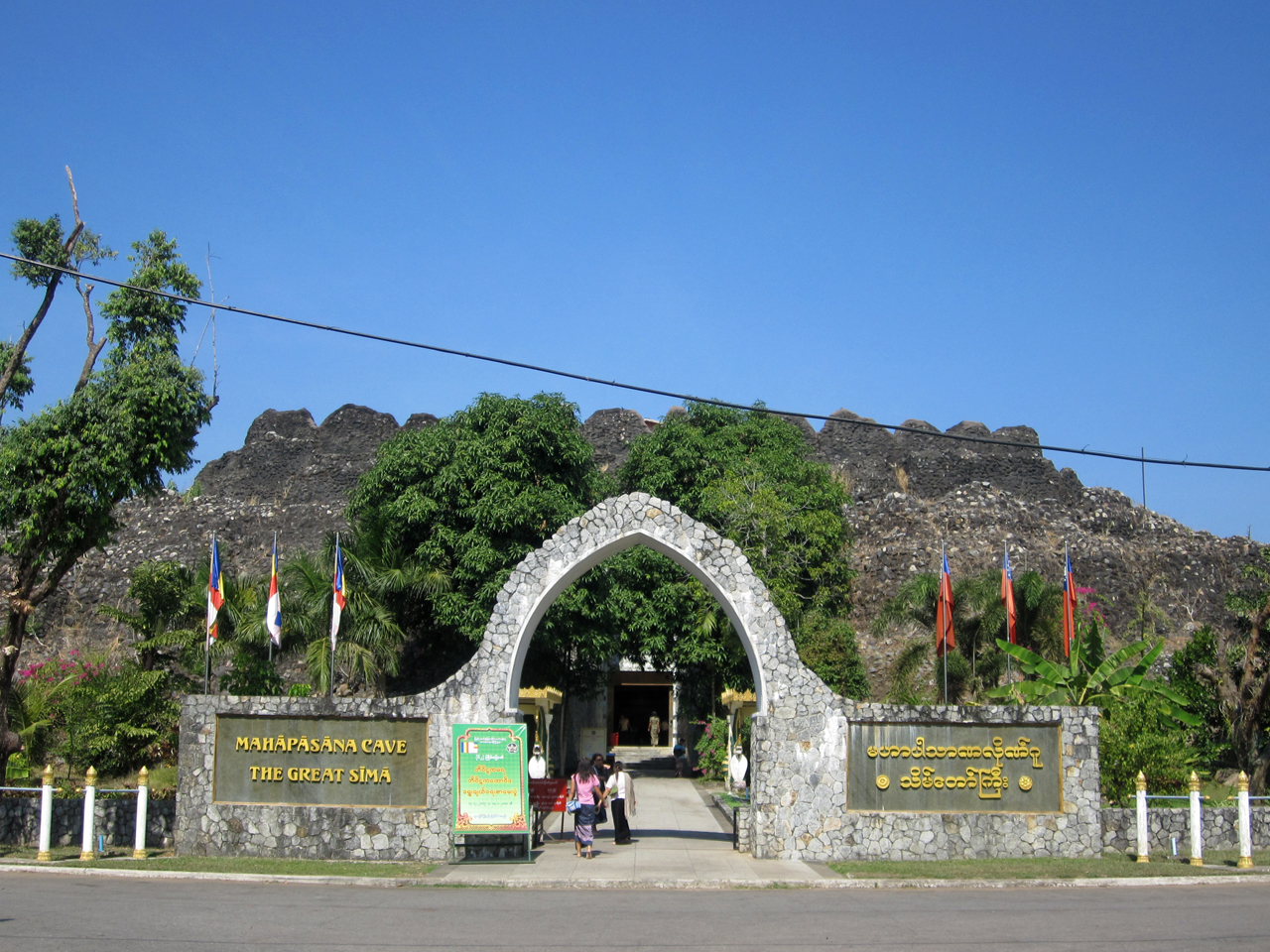
Mahāpāsāṇa Guhā Cave is where the Tipiṭakadhra Tipiṭakakovida examinations are held annually.

The whole examinations process takes 33 days in total – from last week of December to the third week of January – at the Kaba Aye Pagoda's Mahāpāsāṇa Cave in Yangon.

At the reciting part, candidates have to take a text for three days, and four times in the morning, and five times in the afternoon each day (25 minutes and 10-minute break per time). They will be prompted only five times in the whole day.

Those who passed the exam without being prompted are marked as "visiṭṭha" (distinguished).

== Titles offered ==
Sayadaws who have passed five levels of ideology writing are awarded the degree of "Tipiṭakakovida" (lit. 'Tripitaka expert'), and the degree of "Tipiṭakadhara Tipiṭakakovida" (lit. 'Expert who keeps Tripitaka in mind') is awarded to those who have passed all levels of the examination. Five years after receiving Tipiṭakadhara Tipiṭakakovida Degree, the Government of Myanmar offers him the title of Tipiṭakadhara Dhammabhanḍāgārika (lit. 'Tripitaka expert and Dhamma treasurer').

=== Reciting ===
1. If one passes on one Piṭaka, a white Kanakkadan umbrella with red handle.
2. If one passes on two Piṭakas, two white Kanakkadan umbrellas with red handles.
3. If one passes on three Piṭakas, three white Kanakkadan umbrellas with red handles.

They are offered Sāsanā flags bearing the above emblems.

=== Ideology written answer ===
1. If one passes one Piṭaka, a white Kanakkadan umbrella with a yellow handle.
2. If one passes two Piṭaka, two white Kanakkadan umbrellas with a yellow handle, Sāsanā flag bearing above emblems, degree-certificate, water-land travel upper-class free ticket, rice for every month, and Navakamma-Vatthu money are offered monthly.
3. If one passes three Tipiṭaka, three white Kanakkadan umbrellas with yellow handle. Sāsanā flag bearing above emblem, Tipiṭakadhara Tipiṭakakovidha pass-certificate, and water-land travel upper-class free ticket, monthly rice for alms-food and nāvakamma-vatthu are offered.

== Recipients ==
The late Venerable Mingun Sayadaw is the first title-winner of the Tipiṭakadhara exam in Burma. As of 2020, only 15 monks have passed both the oral and written components, who are recognized by the Burmese government as "Sāsana Azani" (Pali: Sāsanājāneyya, lit. "Noble Hero of the Buddhist doctrine").

The awarded 16 Tipiṭakadhara Tipiṭakakovida, Tipiṭakadhara Dhammabhanḍāgārika Sayadaws are as follows.

No.	Dharma name	Common title	Name in Burmese	Pass year	Location of study
1	Bhaddanta Vicittasārābhivaṃsa (1911–1993)	Mingun Sayadaw	ဘဒ္ဒန္တ ဝိစိတ္တသာရာဘိဝံသ (မင်းကွန်းဆရာတော်)	1953	Dhammanāda monastery, Mingun
2	Bhaddanta Neminda (1928–1991)	Pakkhoku Sayadaw	ဘဒ္ဒန္တ နေမိန္ဒ (ပခုက္ကူဆရာတော်)	1959	Mahāvisutārāma monastery, Mawlamyine
3	Bhaddanta Kosalla (1921–1995)	Pyay Sayadaw	ဘဒ္ဒန္တ ကောသလ္လ (ပြည်ဆရာတော်)	1963	Pañcanikāya monastery, Yankin
4	Bhaddanta Sumaṅgalālaṅkāra (1946–2006)	Gandarum Sayadaw	ဘဒ္ဒန္တ သုမင်္ဂလာလင်္ကာရ (ဂန္ဓာရုံဆရာတော်)	1973	Mahāgadhāruṃ monastery, Mayangon
5	Bhaddanta Sīrindābhivaṃsa (1943 – )	Yaw Sayadaw	ဘဒ္ဒန္တ သီရိန္ဒာဘိဝံသ (ယောဆရာတော်)	1984	Mahāvisuddhāruṃ monastery, Bahan
6	Bhaddanta Vāyāmindābhivaṃsa (1955 – )	Yayzagyo Sayadaw	ဘဒ္ဒန္တ ဝါယာမိန္ဒာဘိဝံသ (ရေစကြိုဆရာတော်)	1995	Tipiṭaka monastery, Dagon
7	Bhaddanta Sīlakkhandhābhivaṃsa (1964 – )	Mawgyun Sayadaw	ဘဒ္ဒန္တ သီလက္ခန္ဒာဘိဝံသ (မော်ကျွန်းဆရာတော်)	1999	Tipiṭakanikāya monastery
8	Bhaddanta Vaṃsapālālaṅkāra (1965 – )	Myinmu Sayadaw	ဘဒ္ဒန္တ ဝံသပါလာလင်္ကာရ (မြင်းမူဆရာတော်)	1999	Tipiṭakanikāya monastery, Mingun
9	Bhaddanta Gandhamālālaṅkāra (1968 – )	Myingyan Sayadaw	ဘဒ္ဒန္တ ဂန္ဓမာလာလင်္ကာရ (မြင်းခြံဆရာတော်)	2000	Dhammanāda monastery, Mingun
10	Bhaddanta Sunada (1955 – )	Tipiṭakadhara Sunlun Sayadaw	ဘဒ္ဒန္တ သုနန္ဒ (စွန်းလွန်းဆရာတော်)	2004	Sulun Vipassanā monastery, Thingangyun
11	Bhaddanta Indapāla (1960 – )	Rammawadi Sayadaw	ဘဒ္ဒန္တ ဣန္ဒပါလ (ရမ္မာဝတီဆရာတော်)	2004	Tipiṭaka monastery, Dagon
12	Bhaddanta Abhijātābhivaṃsa (1968 – )	Sagaing Tipitaka Sayadaw	ဘဒ္ဒန္တ အဘိဇာတာဘိဝံသ (စစ်ကိုင်းဆရာတော်)	2010	Mahāsubodāruṃ monastery, Sagaing
13	Bhaddanta Indācariya (1964 – )	Butalin Sayadaw	ဘဒ္ဒန္တ ဣန္ဒာစရိယ (ဘုတလင်ဆရာတော်)	2012	Tipiṭakanikāya monastery, Mingun
14	Bhaddanta Vīriyānanda	Kanbawza Sayadaw	ဘဒ္ဒန္တ ဝီရိယာနန္ဒ (ကမ္ဗောဇဆရာတော်)	2017	Tipiṭakanikāya monastery, Dagon
15	Bhaddanta Paññāvaṃsābhivaṃsa	Kyaukpadaung Sayadaw	ဘဒ္ဒန္တ ပညာဝံသာဘိဝံသ (ကျောက်ပန်းတောင်းဆရာတော်)	2020	Mahagandawinnikaya monastery, Dagon Myothit (East)
16	Bhaddanta Paññāsirīlaṅkāra		ဘဒ္ဒန္တ ပညာသိရီလင်္ကာရ	2024	Tipiṭakanikāya monastery, Dagon
17	Bhaddanta Seṭṭhañāṇālaṅkāra	Ye-oo Sayadaw	ဘဒ္ဒန္တ ‌သေဋ္ဌဉာဏာလင်္ကာရ (ရေဦးဆရာတော်)	2025	Mahagandawinnikaya monastery, Dagon Myothit (East)
