= Śāsana =

Buddhist term

Śāsana (Sanskrit: शासन, śāsana; Pali: sāsana) is a Buddhist term for the distribution time or availability of the teachings of a Buddha. The currently available philosophy and practice dates back to Siddhartha Gautama, and is only accessible for a limited period.

It can be translated as teaching, practice, discipline, doctrine, and the "Teaching of the Buddha". Śāsana is considered a more accurate term than "religion", as it avoids the implication of an unchanging, divine call from an all-knowing creator god.

The term śāsana is also used for the 5,000-year Buddha's Dispensation; the current śāsana is of Śakyamuni Buddha.
