= Sayadaw =

Burmese Buddhist title

A sayadaw (Burmese: ဆရာတော်, IPA: [sʰəjàdɔ̀]; lit. 'royal teacher', and alternatively spelled hsayadaw, sayado, sayāḍo or sayāḍaw) is a Burmese Buddhist title used to reference the senior monk or abbot of a monastery. The word is a combination of Sanskrit word "acharya" (teacher) and the Burmese honorific "taw," which is used to denote nouns of religious or royal significance. Some distinguished sayadaws would often be referred to as a sayadawgyi (ဆရာတော်ကြီး, as a sign of reverence. The terms "sayadaw" and "sayadawgyi" originally corresponded to the senior monks who taught the former Burmese kings. These sayadaws may be influential teachers of Buddhism and also important meditation practitioners. They usually are abbots of monasteries or monastery networks with many resident monks and a lay following. In modern-day Myanmar, monastic abbots are required to have passed monastic examinations.

In Burmese Buddhism, several honorific terms exist for Buddhist monks, reflecting their achievements and how many vassas they have passed. The most frequently used terms, which are used as prefixes to the monks' Dhamma name, include:

- "Bhaddanta" ဘဒ္ဒန္တ
- "Ashin" အရှင်
- "Shin" ရှင်
- "U" ဦး၊ ဥူး
- "Upazin" ဥပဇင်း
- "Sayadaw" ဆရာတော်
- "Sayadawgyi" ဆရာတော်ကြီး

A sayadaw may be known by his dharma name (ဘွဲ့), a qualified name, or by the name of his monastery. Thus, venerable Mingun Sayadaw, who served as "Chief Respondent" at the Sixth Buddhist council in Yangon, could be addressed as:

- Mingun Sayadaw (in reference to his home monastery at Mingun) မင်းကွန်းဆရာတော်
- U Vicittasārābhivaṃsa ဦးဝိစိတ္တသာရာဘိဝံသ
- Sayadaw U Vicittasārābhivaṃsa ဆရာတော်ဦးဝိစိတ္တသာရာဘိဝံသ
- Mingun Sayadaw U Vicittasārābhivaṃsa မင်းကွန်းဆရာတော်ဦးဝိစိတ္တသာရာဘိဝံသ
- Tipitaka Sayadaw U Vicittasārābhivaṃsa တိပိဋကဆရာတော်ဦးဝိစိတ္တသာရာဘိဝံသ
- tipiṭakadhara Dhammabhaṇḍādharika Sayadaw U Vicittasārābhivaṃsa, တိပိဋကဓရဓမ္မဘဏ္ဍာဓရိကဆရာတော်ဦးဝိစိတ္တသာရာဘိဝ့သ reference to being the first monk to be awarded the titles "Bearer of the Tripiṭaka" and "Treasurer of the Dhamma"

== List of prominent Sayadaws ==
The following is a list of some prominent sayadaws in recent Burmese history.

- Shwe Nya War Sayadaw
- Sayadaw U Tejaniya
- Ledi Sayadaw
- Mingun Sayadaw
- Mahasi Sayadaw
- Webu Sayadaw
- Mogok Vimala
- Chanmyay Sayadaw
- Thamanya Sayadaw
- Maha Bodhi Ta Htaung Sayadaw
- Ashin Sandadika
- Sitagu Sayadaw
- U Pandita
- Ashin Nandamalabhivamsa
- Thi Lung Sayadaw
- Bhaddanta Āciṇṇa
- Taung Galay Sayadaw
- Ashin Dhammasāmi
