= Sixth Buddhist council =

Buddhist Council

The Sixth Buddhist Council (Pali: छट्ठ सॅगायना (Chaṭṭha Saṅgāyana); Burmese: ဆဋ္ဌမသင်္ဂါယနာ; Sinhala: ඡට්ඨ සංගායනා) was a general council of Theravāda Buddhism, held in a specially built Mahā Pāsāṇa Guhā (Great Cave) and pagoda complex at Kaba Aye Pagoda in Yangon, Burma. The council was attended by 2500 monastics from eight Theravādin Buddhist countries. The Council lasted from Vesak (Visākha) 1954 to Vesak 1956, its completion coinciding with the traditional 2500th anniversary of the Gautama Buddha's Parinibbāna. In the tradition of past Buddhist councils, a major purpose of the Sixth Council was to preserve the Buddha's teachings and practices as understood in the Theravadin tradition.

Over the two-year period, monks (sangīti-kāraka) from different countries recited from their existing redaction of the Pāli Canon and the associated post-canonical literature. As a result, the Council synthesized a new redaction of the Pali texts ultimately transcribed into several native scripts.

== Timing and participants ==
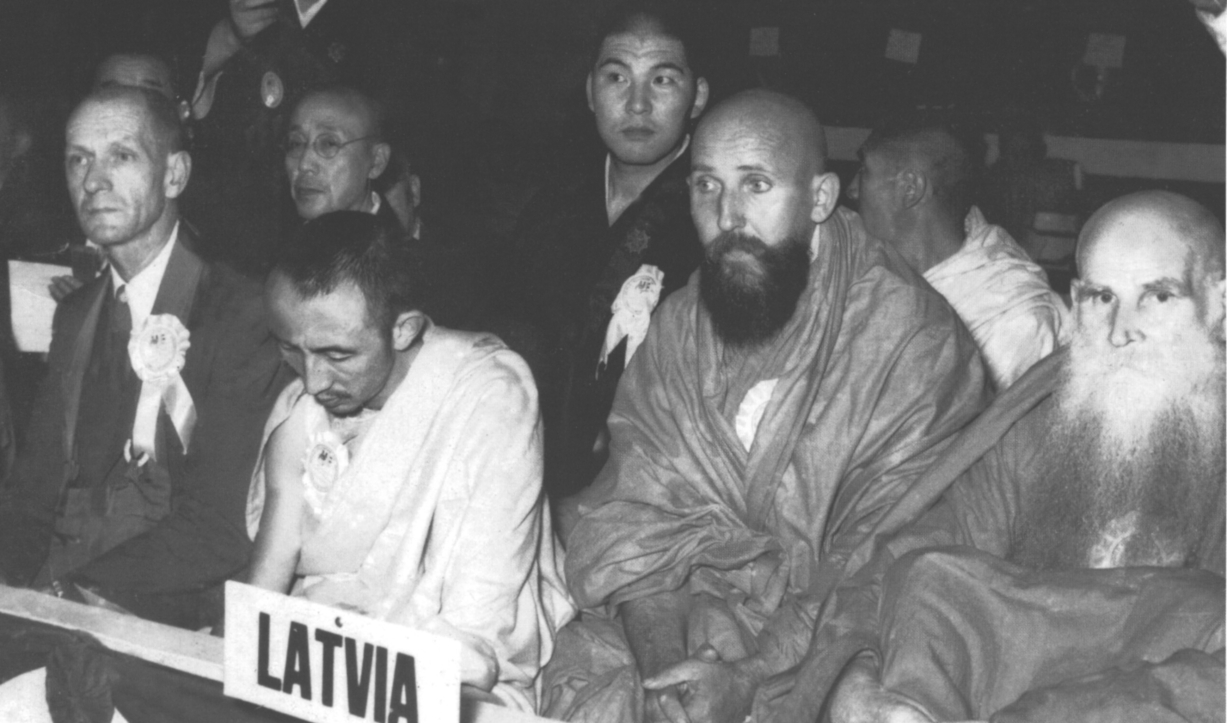
Martin Steinke (German Buddhist delegate), Kushok Bakula Rinpoche, Friedrich Voldemar Lustig, and Karl Tõnisson (on the right) represented Latvia as delegates at the congress of the World Buddhist Federation in Rangoon 1954 at the opening of the Sixth Buddhist Council

The Council was convened 83 years after the Burmese Fifth Buddhist council was held in Mandalay. The Council commenced proceedings on Vesak, 17 May 1954, in order to allow sufficient time to conclude its work on Vesak, 24 May 1956, the day marking the 2500-year celebration of Gautama Buddha's Parinibbāna according to traditional Theravada dating.

The Sixth Council was sponsored by the Burmese Government led by Prime Minister U Nu. He authorized the construction of the Kaba Aye Pagoda and the Mahāpāsāṇa Guhā or "Great Cave" in which the work of the council took place. This venue was designed to be like the cave in which the First Buddhist council was held.

As in the preceding councils, the Sixth Council's aim was to affirm and preserve the genuine Dhamma and Vinaya. The 2500 participating Theravādan Elders came from eight countries: Burma, Thailand, Cambodia, Laos, Vietnam, Sri Lanka, India, and Nepal.Notable participants included representatives from China, Indonesia, Germany, and the Chittagong Buddhist Association (from East Pakistan, now Bangladesh). Also in attendance were the Bengali Buddhist Association from India, delegates from Malaya (modern-day Malaysia), and humanitarian and Buddhist representatives from the United States. A temple in Japan also sent delegates. The only Western monks to participate were German-born, Sri-Lanka-residing Nyanatiloka Thera, Nyanaponika Thera, Karl Tõnisson (known as Brother Vahindra) and Friedrich Lustig (known as Ashin Ananda).

Mahasi Sayadaw was appointed to ask the required questions about the Dhamma to Mingun Sayadaw, who answered them. Following the Sixth Council, Myanmar became a major source of international Vipassana meditation movements (notably through Mahasi Sayadaw) that spread to the world. The most prestigious religious recognition went to Mingun Sayadaw, who was officially recognized as the first "Bearer of the Three Pitakas" for reciting all 16,000 pages of the canon from memory. In 1985, the Guinness World Records recorded Mingun Sayadaw as a record holder in the Human memory category.

"Prominent political figures in attendance included King Bhumibol Adulyadej and Prime Minister Field Marshal Plaek Phibunsongkhram of Thailand; King Norodom Sihanouk and Prime Minister Penn Nouth of Cambodia; Crown Prince Savang Vatthana and the Prime Minister of Laos; as well as ministerial representatives from Ceylon. During this diplomatic assembly, the University of Rangoon conferred an honorary doctorate upon King Sihanouk. Concurrently, the Burmese government bestowed the Order of Agga Maha Thiri Thudhamma—the highest national honor—upon both King Bhumibol and Prime Minister Phibunsongkhram of Thailand.

In addition to the physical presence of international scholars and organizational delegates, the Council received high-level diplomatic support. Formal messages of commendation were sent by world leaders, including Indian Prime Minister Jawaharlal Nehru, the Prime Minister of Sikkim, the King and Prime Minister of Nepal, the Prime Minister of Japan, and the Government of the Ryukyu Islands. Notably, a message from Queen Elizabeth II was delivered and read by the British Ambassador to Burma, Lord Paul Gore-Booth, Baron Gore-Booth.

The Sixth Buddhist Council (Chaṭṭha Saṅgāyana), held from 1954 to 1956 in Yangon, Myanmar, represented a landmark event in modern Theravada history. Convened to coincide with the 2,500th anniversary of the Buddha's Parinibbāna, its primary objective was the systematic purification and standardization of the Pali Canon (Tipitaka).

The most significant academic achievement of the Council was the production of the Chaṭṭha Saṅgāyana edition of the Buddhist scriptures. Over 2,500 monks from various Theravada nations—including Sri Lanka, Thailand, Laos, and Cambodia—rigorously cross-referenced the Burmese texts against international versions and ancient palm-leaf manuscripts. This process eliminated centuries of scribal errors and inconsistencies, resulting in an authoritative 40-volume set of the Tipitaka, complemented by its commentaries (Atthakatha) and sub-commentaries (Tika).

The Council served as a catalyst for transnational Buddhist unity. By inviting high-ranking monks and scholars, it bridged regional doctrinal gaps and fostered a collective identity among Theravada practitioners.

== Resultant texts ==
By the time this council met all the participating countries had had the Pali Tipiṭaka rendered into their native scripts, with the exception of India. During the two years that the Council met, the Tipiṭaka and its allied literature in all scripts were painstakingly examined with their differences noted down, the necessary corrections made, and collated. Not much difference was found in the content of any of the texts. Finally, after the Council had officially approved the texts, all of the books of the Tipiṭaka and their commentaries were prepared for printing on modern presses. This notable achievement was made possible through the dedicated efforts of the 2500 monks and numerous lay people. Their work came to an end with the rise of the full moon on the evening of 24 May 1956, the 2500th anniversary of the Buddha's Parinibbāna according to the traditional Theravada dating.

Following the Sixth Council, Myanmar became a major source of international Vipassana meditation movements that spread to the World .The most prestigious religious recognition went to Mingun Sayadaw, who was officially recognized as the first "Bearer of the Three Pitakas" for reciting all 16,000 pages of the canon from memory.In 1985, the Guinness World Records recorded Mingun Sayadaw as a record holder in the Human memory category.

This council's work was the unique achievement of representatives from the entire Buddhist world. After the scriptures had been examined thoroughly several times, they were put into print, covering 52 treatises in 40 volumes. At the end of this Council, all the participating countries had the Tipiṭaka rendered into their native scripts except India. The version of the Tipitaka which it undertook to produce has been recognized as being true to the pristine teachings of the Buddha and the most authoritative rendering of them to date.

=== Dhamma Society Fund 6th Buddhist Council Tipitaka Edition ===
Since the year 1999, the Dhamma Society Fund in Thailand has been revising the 1958 Sixth Council Edition with other editions to remove all printing and editorial errors. This romanized version in 40 volumes, known as the World Tipitaka Edition, was completed in 2005. The 40-volume Tipitaka Studies Reference appeared in 2007.

The Dhamma Society Fund is currently printing the World Tipitaka Edition in Roman Script based on the B.E. 2500 Great International Tipitaka Council Resolution (1958 Sixth Buddhist Council) with sponsorship from the Royal Matriarch of Thailand, Tipitaka patrons and leaders of business community, for distribution as a gift of Dhamma worldwide, with a priority for the libraries and institutes around the world which had received the Siam-script Tipitaka as a royal gift from King Chulalongkorn of Siam over a century ago.

== See also ==
- Buddhist councils
  - First Buddhist council
  - Second Buddhist council
  - Third Buddhist council
  - Fourth Buddhist council
  - Fifth Buddhist council
- Pāli Canon
  - Sutta Pitaka
  - Vinaya Pitaka
  - Abhidhamma Pitaka
- List of Sāsana Azani recipients
- Tipitakadhara Tipitakakovida Selection Examinations
- Tripiṭaka tablets at Kuthodaw Pagoda
