= Mingun Sayadaw =

Burmese Buddhist monk and scholar

- မင်းကွန်းဆရာတော်
- Title: Sayadaw

Personal life
- Born: Maung Khin; 1 November 1911 Kyipin Village, Myingyan District, Mandalay Division, British Burma
- Died: 9 February 1993 (aged 81) Yangon, Yangon Division, Myanmar
- Occupation: Buddhist monk

Religious life
- Religion: Buddhism
- School: Theravada
- Dharma names: Shin Vicittasara; Vicittasārābhivaṃsa (IAST) ဝိစိတ္တသာရာဘိဝံသ (Burmese)

Senior posting
- Teacher: • U Sobhita • Daw Dhammacari • U Pannacakka.
- Based in: Mingun, Sagaing Division, Myanmar

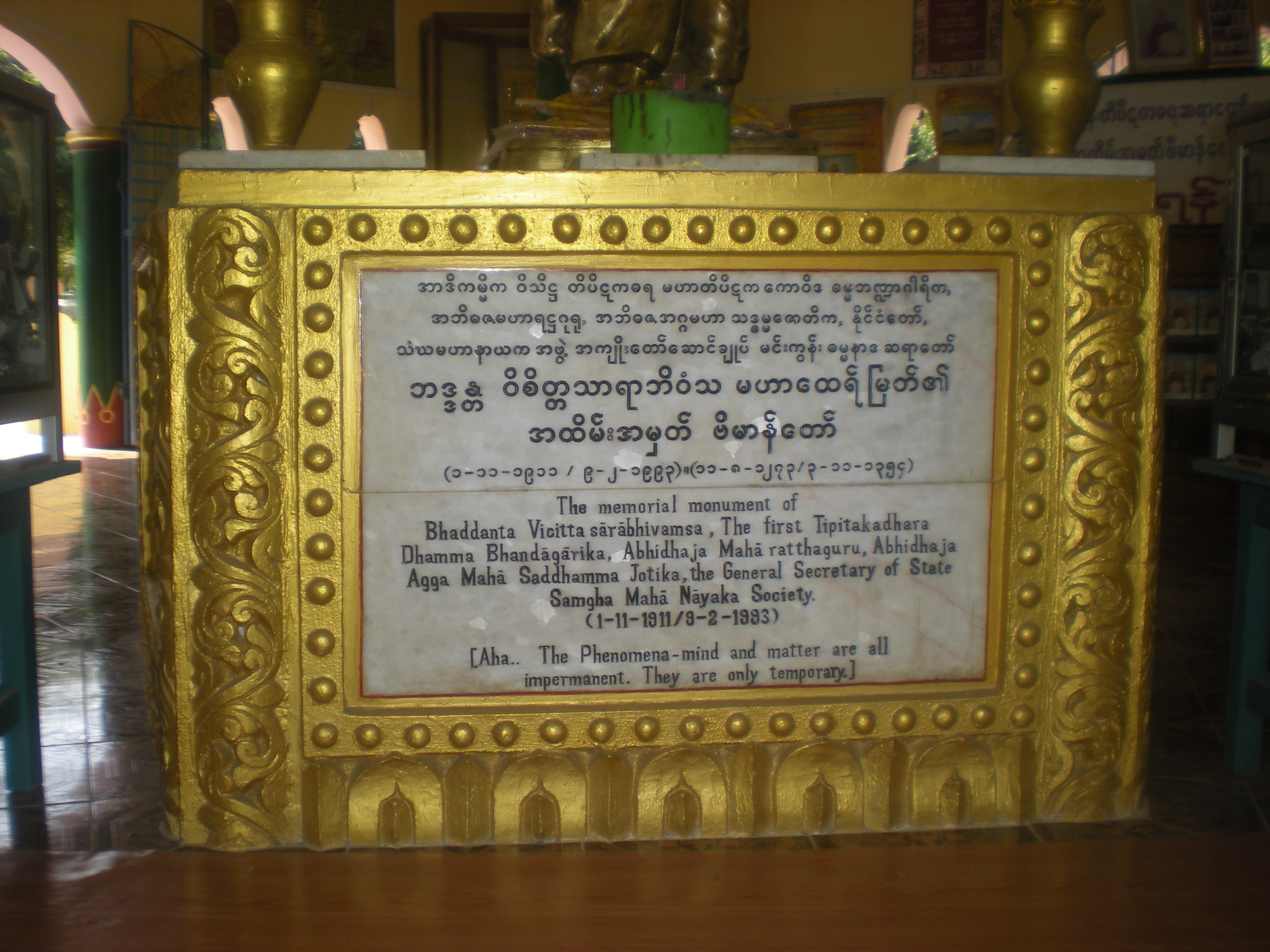
Inscription at the base of the statue.

The Venerable Mingun Sayadaw U Vicittasārābhivaṃsa (Burmese: မင်းကွန်းဆရာတော် ဦးဝိစိတ္တသာရာဘိဝံသ, pronounced [mɪ́ɰ̃ɡʊ́ɰ̃ sʰəjàdɔ̀ ʔú wḭseiʔda̰ θàɹà bḭwʊ̀ɰ̃θa̰]; 1 November 1911 – 9 February 1993) was a Burmese Theravāda Buddhist monk, best known for his memory skills and his role in the Sixth Buddhist Council. He was nicknamed The Book Man.

After the Council, from 1956 to 1969, he wrote The Great chronicles of Buddhas, a collection in 6 volumes.

He left a dual legacy: spiritual, his numerous writings and audio recordings, in which he recites the sacred texts of Theravada Buddhism; and material: thanks to his action, a hospital for religious has been built in Mandalay, as well as the State Pariyatti Sasana University.

== Biography ==
=== Early life and education ===
Ven. Mingun Sayadaw was born Maung Khin to U Sone and Daw Sin in 1911 in Kyipin Village in Myingyan Township, Mandalay Province, British Burma. From the age of 4, following the death of his father, little Maung Khin was raised by his grandfather. During his youth, he was noted for being reserved and his cleanliness.

At the age of 5, he was sent to the village monastery according to Burmese Buddhist tradition, to get a basic monastic education. The presiding sayadaw was U Sasana who had been educated at the Nan Oo Monastery, a prominent monastery in Mandalay.

His grandfather, U Chai, taught him Buddhist prayers and recitations. It was for these that he would gain great following and fame as the Mingun Sayadaw. At the age of 7, he was temporarily noviciated as per Theravada tradition, at the Min Kyaung Taik in Myingyan, with U Sobhita as preceptor. By this time, young Maung's memory was already well developed. In addition to religious texts, he read everything he could get his hands on: magazines, novels, books, etc., such was his thirst for knowledge

=== Religious background ===
At 10, his mother sponsored his initiation into the Sangha, again under the tutelage of U Sobhita. He was conferred the monastic name Shin Vicittasara, which means Outstanding in Pali. Mingun Sayadaw's religious life was punctuated by examinations, which he took almost every year. At 13, he sat for the Vinaya Examination held by the Sanghasamaggi Association in Myingyan, gaining prominence in the Myingyan religious circle. The next year, he sat for another exam, the Pariyatti Examination where he successfully recited the Abhidhamma from memory to the invigilating senior monks. Afterwards, he sat for various grading religious examinations.

In 1930, Shin Vicittasara moved to Mingun in Sagaing Division to continue his further studies at the Dhammananda Monastery. From that time till his death in 1993, he would be based in Mingun, thus became known as the Mingun Sayadaw. He received great support from a thilashin, Daw Dhammacari. In the same year, he was ordained as a monk with the support of Sir and Lady Thwin. In 1933, he was conferred the rare title of Pahtamakyaw as he passed the Highest level religious Examination at the top of his cohort.

The Maha Sanghasamaggi Association, which conducted the religious exams conferred the suffix Abhivamsa to his name in 1934. Thus, the sayadaw had gained his dhamma name with which he would be renowned throughout Myanmar.

From 1950 to 1953, the sayadaw sat and passed the state conducted Tipitakadhara Selection Examination, for which the government of the newly independent Union of Burma conferred various titles and honours. In 1953, he became the first monk ever to be awarded the title of Tipitakadhara, meaning Keeper and Guardian of the Tipitaka. From 1956 to 1969, at the request of the government, he wrote what was to become his major work, The Great Chronicles of Buddhas, in 6 volumes (see details below).

When wealthy donors proposed building decorative features in his monastery, he suggested that it would be more useful to build hospitals, clinics or schools in remote villages that lacked almost everything.

As far as his strength allowed, he preached wherever he was invited until the end of his life. To those who advised him to take a rest, he replied:

as a monk he was doing what a monk should do.

=== Sixth Buddhist Council ===
Under the auspices and patronage of the U Nu government, the Sixth Buddhist Council was held in the purpose-built Mahapasana Cave at the Kaba Aye Pagoda in Yangon from 1954 to 1956. Alongside the Venerable Mahasi Sayadaw, the Mingun Sayadaw played a key role in the Sangha Executive Committee. As the "Chief Respondent", he participated in answering all questions concerning the Vinaya, the portion of the Tripitaka dealing with disciplinary rules of the Sangha. It was said that the sayadaw recalled the exact book, page and line of every term in the Tripitaka

The Dagon University of Myanmar, on the occasion of the Commemoration of 25th Anniversary Silver Jubilee Research, published an article titled The Contribution of Mingun Sayadaw To The Sixth Great Buddhist Council. Here is an excerpt:

The consequences of the Sixth Buddhist Council go far beyond the boundry{sic} of Myanmar. Not only standardized purified Texts as the Sixth Council version also the message of peace and tolerance had spread around the world as the consequence of the Council. These Sixth Council’s version of Pāli Texts became easy reference books. [...]
The Venerable Sayadaw's extraordinary performance as Respondent in the Council had added up the noble dignity and success of the Sixth Buddhist Council and contributed greatly for the perpetuation and propagation of Buddha Sāsanā for many centuries to come

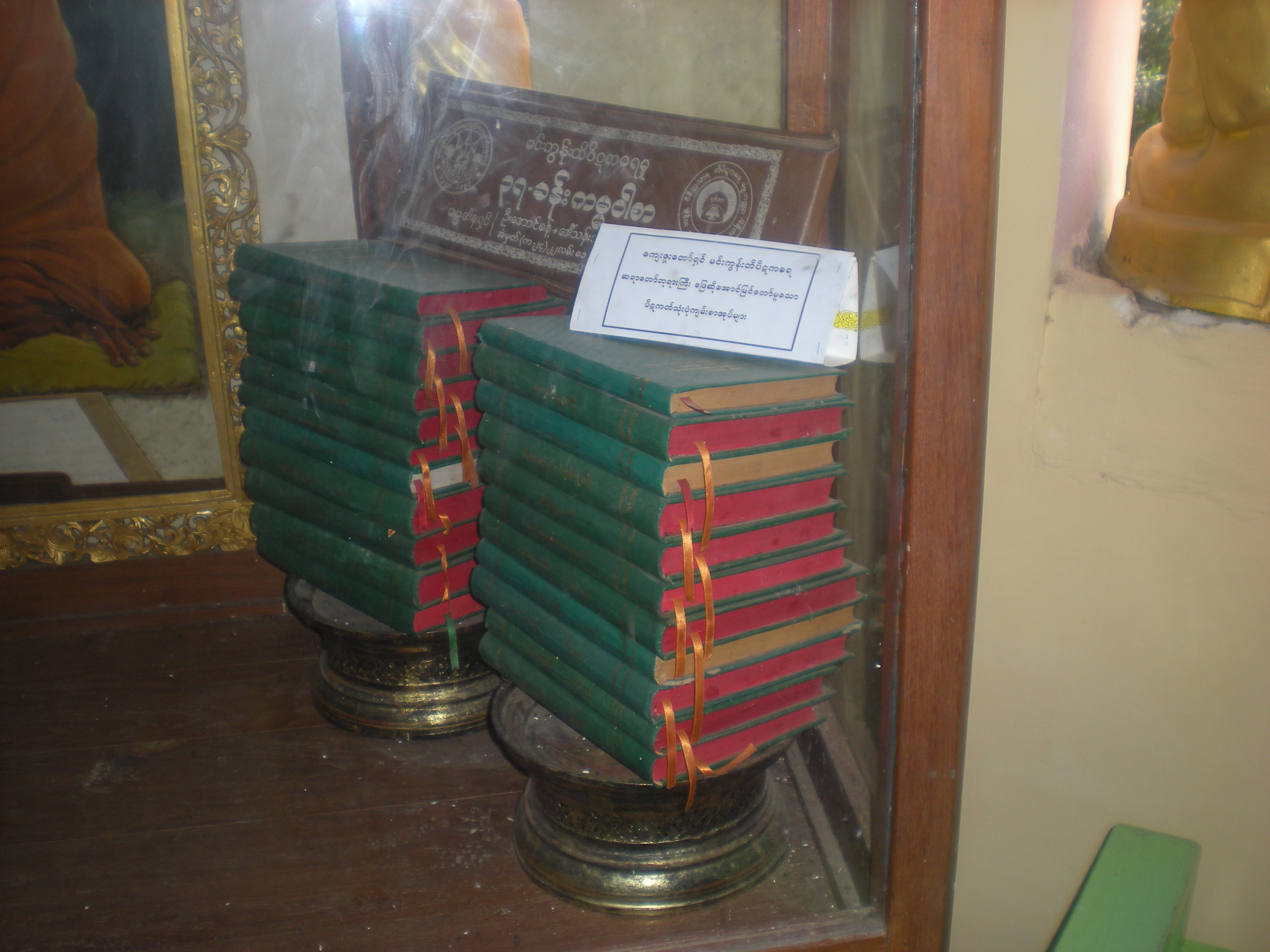
Mingun Sayadaw's Tripiṭaka books.

=== Main work ===
After the Council, he devoted himself to literary pursuits. At the Request of Prime Minister U Nu and the Buddha Sasana Council, he began work on a treatise on the Life Story of the Buddhas, titled the Maha Buddhavamsa from 1956 to 1969.

The treatise, published under the title The Great Chronicles of Buddhas, in 6 volumes, is considered the crowning achievement of the Sayadaw's literary work.

=== Last years and death ===
Mingun Sayadaw was in his 80s when the current military government of Myanmar took power. He distanced himself from the democracy demonstrations and the 8888 movement. As the government solidified its position, the sayadaw was approached by the government to attend its religious events, which he agreed to do so. The sayadaw did not engage in any politics but a few radical elements of the pro democracy movement considered him as a government lackey. However, his reputation was never tarnished as he continued his religious work until the very end

After the council, Mingun Sayadaw fell seriously ill. His health remained very fragile thereafter.

He died on 9 February 1993, following a viral infection that broke out in 1992. He was given a state funeral, attended by the country's leaders, clerics, civil servants and crowds of devotees. His ashes were scattered in various places around the country

== Amazing memory ==
In 1985, the Guinness World Records recorded Mingun Sayadaw as a record holder in the Human memory category. The exact entry was:

Human memory: Bhandanta Vicitsara (sic) recited 16,000 pages of Buddhist canonical text in Rangoon, Burma in May 1954. Rare instances of eidetic memory – the ability to project and hence "visually" recall material – are known to science.

== Legacy ==
Mingun Sayadaw's legacy is twofold :

Spiritual

In addition to his writings, he has come to embody the Burmese dedication to Buddhism and also of the Burmese Buddhist sangha. His recitations of the Patthana and the suttas are one of the most popular Buddhist audio materials sold in Myanmar.

Material

- He initiated the construction of the Jīvitadāna Sāsana Specialized Health Center in Mandalay, reserved for religious people. It is a 100-bed hospital with modern equipment and materials. It was inaugurated on August 18, 1990, in the presence of Mingun Sayadaw.

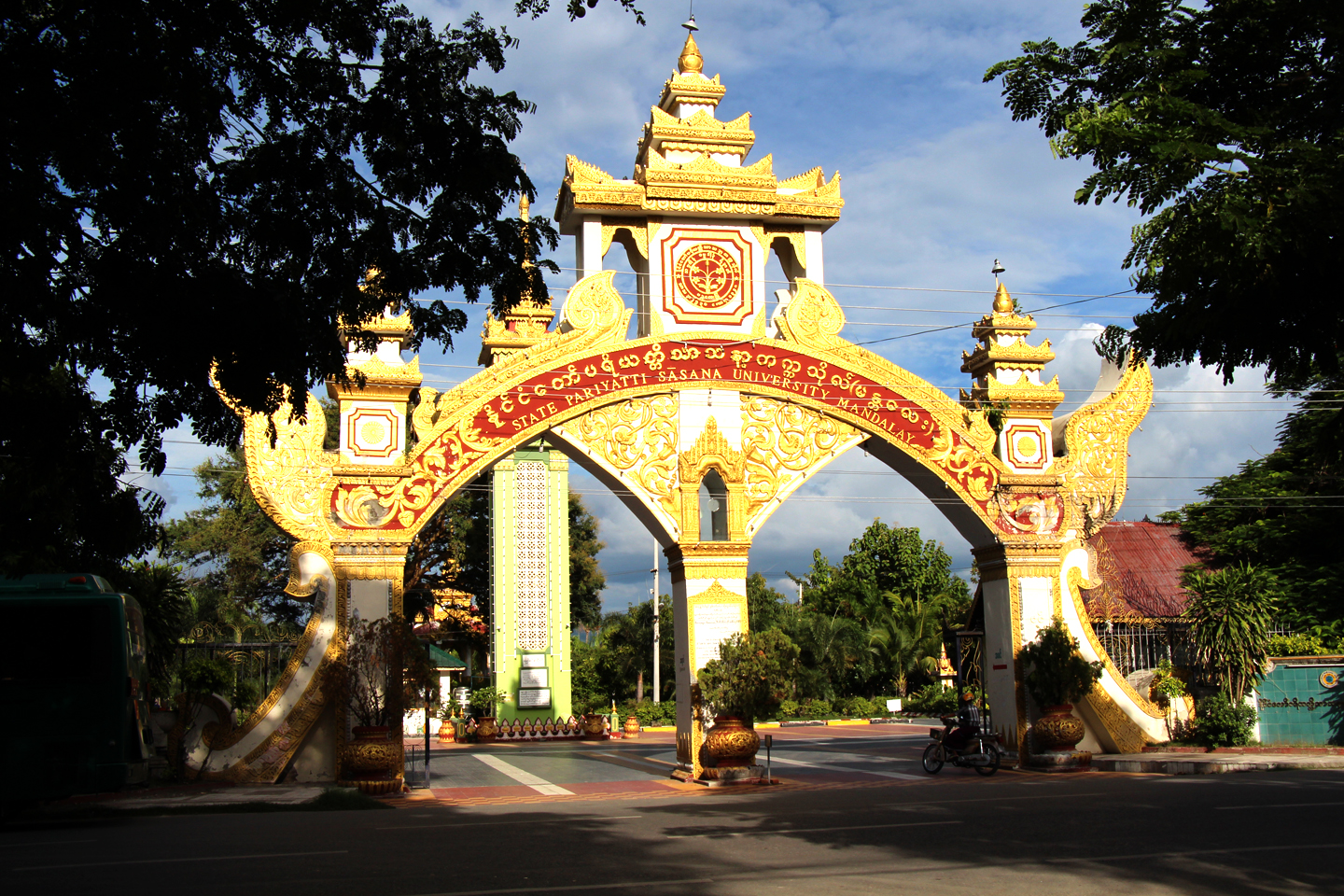
State Pariyatti Sãsana University (Mandalay)

- On 17 October 1980, Mingun Sayadaw, then aged 70, was appointed by the government to head the Committee for the Construction and Donation of the State Pariyatti Sasana University of Mandalay. After choosing the site where it would be built, he travelled the country to find donors, preaching tirelessly (Note: Although the construction of the State University was a government decision, funding was largely provided by the donors and sponsors that Mingun Sayadaw, by virtue of his reputation, was responsible for finding.). Six years later, the university was inaugurated on 21 August 1986.

== Bibliography ==
- Tipitaka Nikaya Ministrative Organization (1991). The Most Venerable Mingun Sayadaw. TI=NI Publishing Centre. p. 40.

== See also ==
=== Internal links ===
Buddhism in Burma Burmese Buddhist titles Dharma name Sayadaw

=== To find out more ===
- Mingun Sayadaw Biography DVD, Mingun Association. Yangon.

=== External links ===
- The Most Venerable Sayadaw U Vicittasarabhivamsa (1911 - 1993).
- Ven. Mingun Sayadaw, The Great chronicles of Buddhas, 1744 p, 2008, Singapore Edition. . This is a compilation of the 6 volumes published in 1991-1998 (the paper version mentioned above).
