= List of modern scholars in Buddhist studies =

This is the list of notable modern scholars in the field of Buddhist studies.

- Eugène Burnouf (1801–1852)
- Viggo Fausböll (1821–1908)
- Robert Caesar Childers (1838–1876)
- T.W. Rhys Davids (1843–1922)
- Nanjo Bunyu (1849–1927)
- Hermann Oldenberg (1854–1920)
- Wilhelm Geiger (1856–1943)
- C.A.F. Rhys Davids (1857–1942)
- Robert Chalmers (1858–1938)
- P. Lakshmi Narasu (1861–1934)
- Takakusu Junjirō (1866–1945)
- D.T. Suzuki (1870–1966)
- Frank Lee Woodward (1871–1952)
- Masaharu Anesaki (1873–1949)
- Nyanatiloka Mahathera (1878–1957)
- A. K. Coomaraswamy (1877–1947)
- Johannes Nobel (1887–1960)
- A. P. Buddhadatta Mahathera (1887–1962)
- Benimadhab Barua (1888–1948)
- Balangoda Ananda Maitreya Thero (1896–1998)
- Isaline Blew Horner (1896–1981)
- Gunapala Piyasena Malalasekera (1899–1973)
- Nyanaponika Thera (1901–1994)
- Edward Conze (1904–1979)
- Ñāṇamoli Bhikkhu (1905–1960)
- K. N. Jayatilleke (1920–1970)
- John Crook (1930–2011)
- Y. Karunadasa (b. 1934)
- David Kalupahana (1936–2014)
- Richard Gombrich (b. 1937)
- P. D. Premasiri (b. 1941)
- Robert Thurman (1941–2026)
- L. S. Cousins (1942–2015)
- Bhikkhu Bodhi (b. 1944)
- Victor Sogen Hori (b. 1944)
- Bernard Faure (b. 1948)
- Shanti Swaroop Baudh (1949–2020)
- K.L. Dhammajoti (b. 1949)
- Steven Heine (b. 1950)
- Damien Keown (b. 1951)
- Masatoshi Ueki (b. 1951)
- Vello Väärtnöu (b. 1951)
- Donald S. Lopez Jr. (b. 1952)
- A. Charles Muller (b. 1953)
- Bhikkhu Analayo (b. 1962)
- James Robson (b. 1965)
- Anne Blackburn (b. 1967)
- Rupert Gethin
- Pabbajjoravitipalivijjamuniyo (b. 1972)
- Erick Tsiknopoulos (b. 1981)
- Jack Meng-Tat Chia (b. 1982)
- David Komito
- Kogen Mizuno (1901–2006), a Japanese Buddhist monk of the Soto sect and scholar of Early Buddhism.
- Jan Nattier

== See also ==
- Pali Text Society
- List of Sāsana Azani recipients
- Mahachulalongkornrajavidyalaya University
- Mahamakut Buddhist University
- International Theravada Buddhist Missionary University
- State Pariyatti Sasana University, Yangon
- State Pariyatti Sasana University, Mandalay
- Dhammaduta Chekinda University
- Buddhist and Pali University of Sri Lanka
- Gautam Buddha University
- Sanchi University of Buddhist-Indic Studies
- Lumbini Buddhist University
- Chittagong Pali College
- Sitagu International Buddhist Academy
- International Buddhist Studies College
- Buddhist Institute, Cambodia
- Oxford Centre for Buddhist Studies
- List of Buddhist universities and colleges
