= Buddhist Institute (Cambodia) =

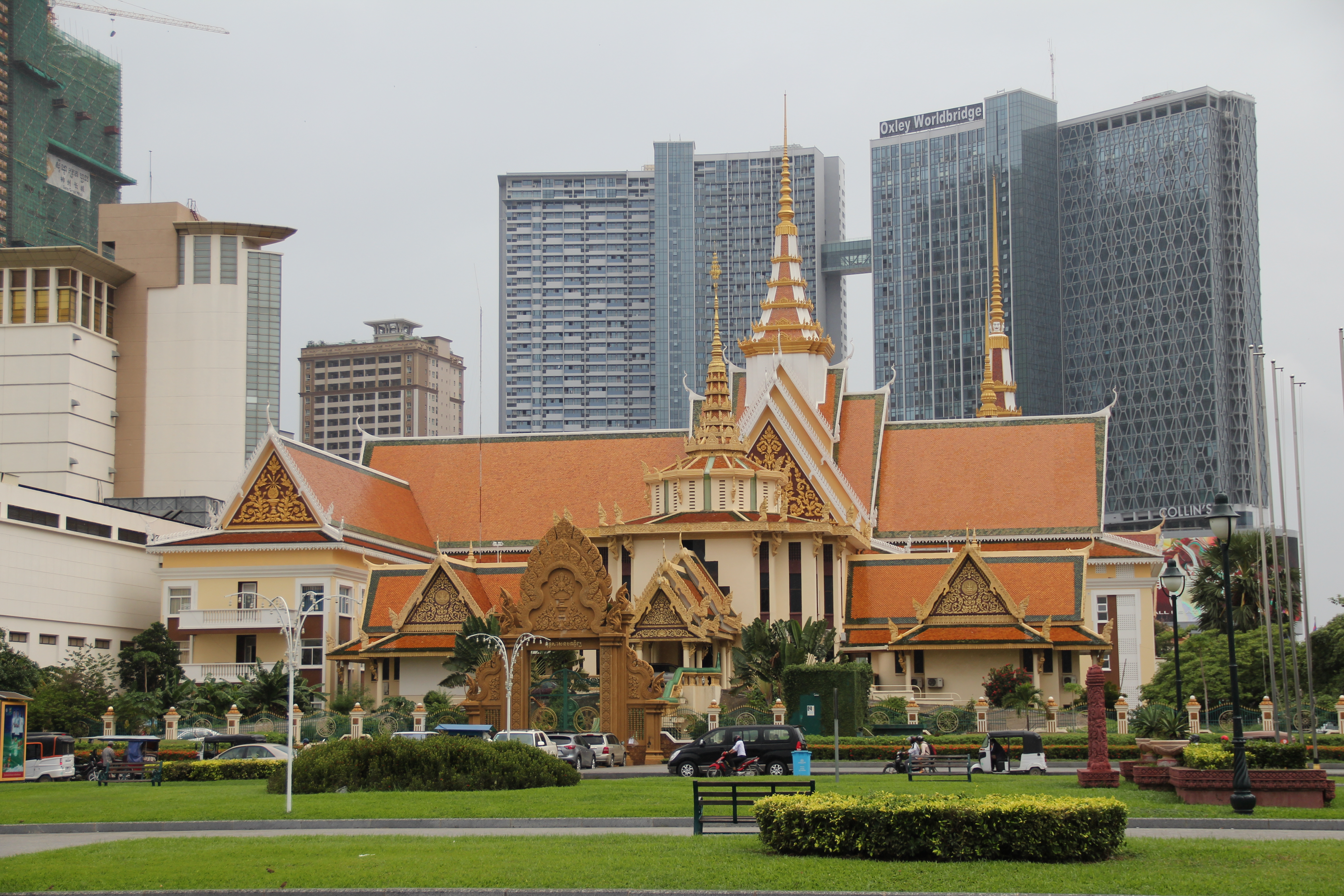
Buddhist Institute, 2019

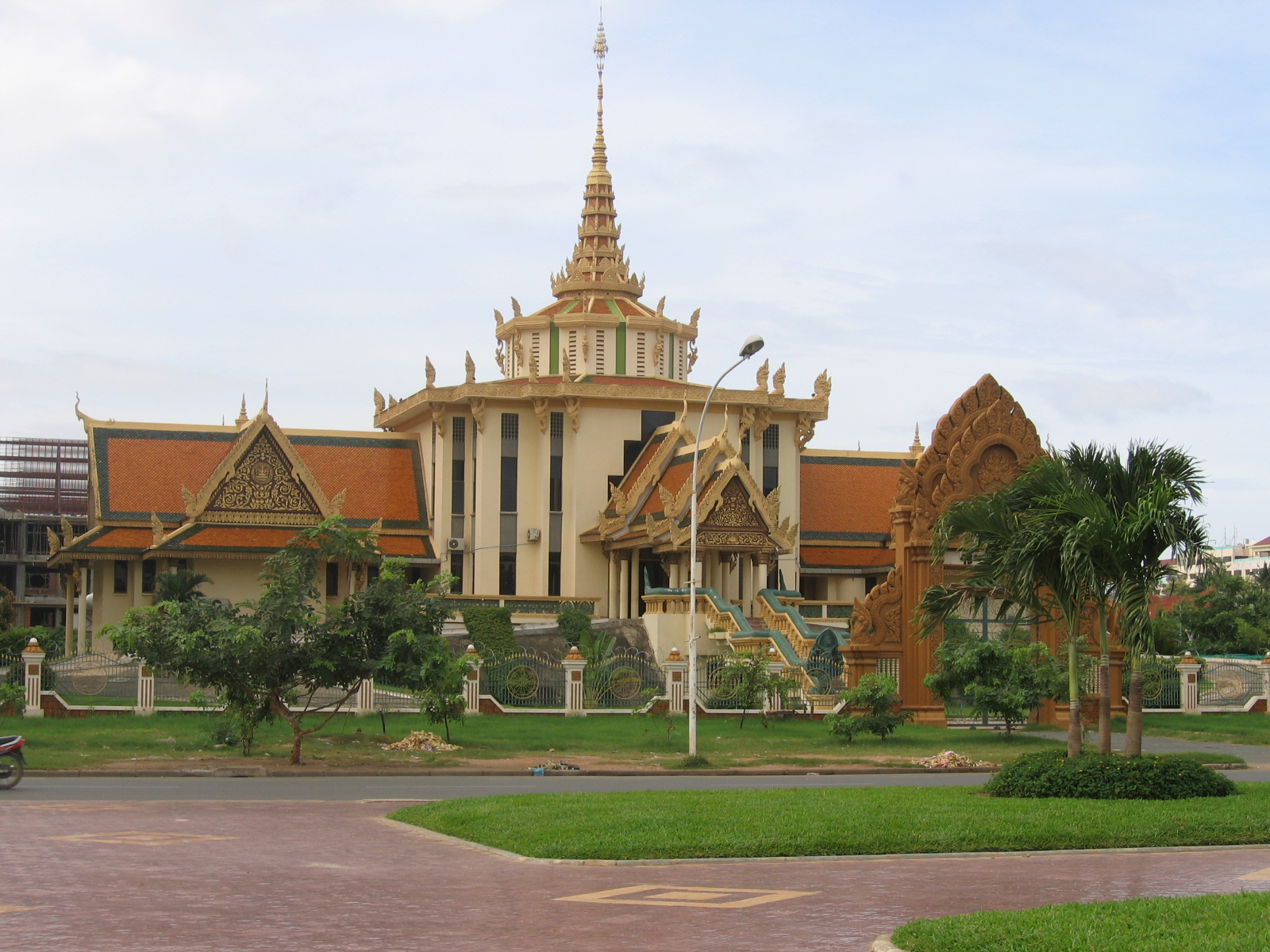
Buddhist Institute, 2005

The Buddhist Institute (Khmer: វិទ្យាស្ថានពុទ្ធសាសនបណ្ឌិត្យ) is the principal Buddhist institution of the government of Cambodia.

The current director is Nguon Van Chanthy. Its primary facilities are located in Phnom Penh.

== History ==
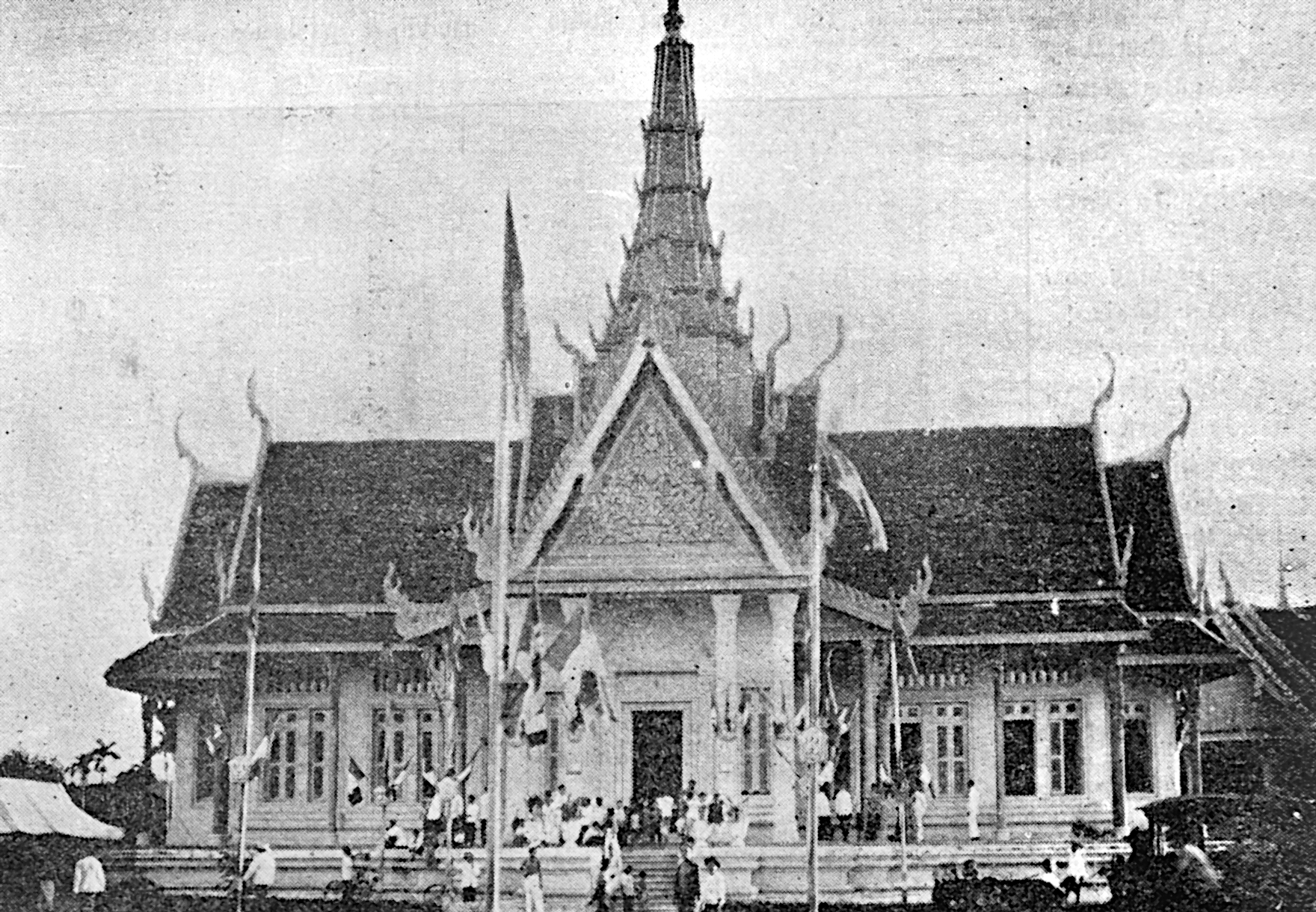
Original building 1930.

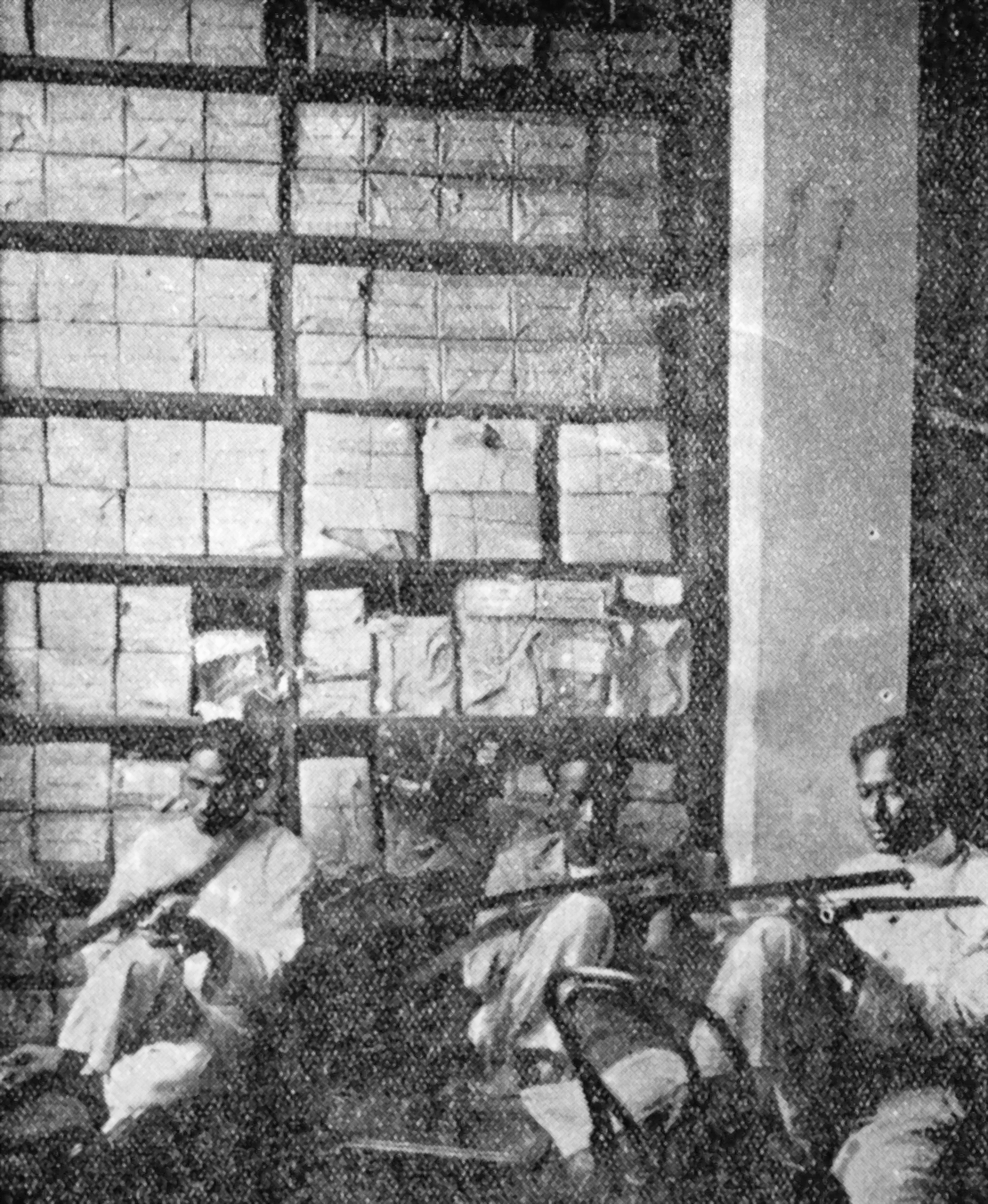
Manuscript copying in the library (1930).

It was founded on May 12, 1930, by King Sisowath Monivong of Cambodia, King Sisavong Vong of Laos, the Governor General of Indochina Pierre Pasquier and head of the École française d'Extrême-Orient, George Coedes.

== Organization ==
- Administrative Department
- Tripitaka Commission
- Mores and Customs Commission
- Library
- Bookstore

== See also ==
- Pāli Canon (Vinaya Pitaka, Sutta Pitaka & Abhidhamma Pitaka)
- Early Buddhist Texts
- Pali literature & Palm-leaf manuscript
- List of Pali Canon anthologies
- Theravada Buddhism
- International Theravada Buddhist Missionary University
- State Pariyatti Sasana University, Yangon
- State Pariyatti Sasana University, Mandalay
- Dhammaduta Chekinda University
- Buddhist and Pali University of Sri Lanka
- Lumbini Buddhist University
- Mahachulalongkornrajavidyalaya University
- Mahamakut Buddhist University
- Monastic schools in Myanmar
- International Buddhist Studies College
- Sitagu International Buddhist Academy
- Chittagong Pali College (Bangladesh)
- Oxford Centre for Buddhist Studies (UK)
- Sanam Luang Dhamma Studies (Thailand)
- Buddhism in Cambodia
