= Prajnananda Mahathera =

Bangladeshi Buddhist monk and educator

Most Venerable Prajñānanda mahāthera
- 𑄝𑅅𑄣𑄬𑄚𑄴𑄘𑄳𑄢 𑄘𑄬𑄤𑄴
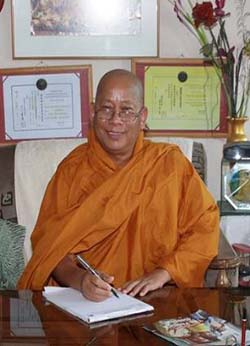

Personal life
- Born: Balendra Dev Chakma 𑄝𑅅𑄣𑄬𑄚𑄴𑄘𑄳𑄢 𑄘𑄬𑄤𑄴 𑄌𑄋𑄟𑄳𑄦; February 1, 1952 (age 74) Rangamati
- Parents: Narendra Lal Chakma (father); Indrapati Chakma (mother)
- Known for: Contribution in education, social reform in Chittagong Hill Tracts (CHT).

Religious life
- Religion: Buddhism
- Order: Mahā Nikāya
- School: Theravāda
- Monastic name: Prajñānanda mahāthera 𑄛𑄐𑄴𑄐𑄚𑄚𑄴𑄘𑄴 𑄟𑄦𑅅𑄗𑄬𑄢

Prajnananda Mahathera is a socially engaged Buddhist monk in Chittagong Hill Tracts (CHT) of Bangladesh.

== Early life ==
Prajnananda Mahathera was born on 1 February 1952 at Babuchara Village under Dighinala Upazila in Khagrachari district of present-day Bangladesh. His family name is Balendra Dev Chakma. His father's name was Narendra Lal Chakma and his mother's name is Indrapati Chakma. Mahathera is the youngest of their 4 sons. His father died when he was one year old. Mahathera's family was difficult, however, he persuaded to succeed in study. He became teacher in his village after passing class five to support his family's finance.

== Education ==
Mahathera completed his primary education at a primary school in his village. After completion of his primary education his family was unable to continue his education due to poverty. He continued his education with some money he earned by tutoring small children near to his home. Thus he completed his Junior School Certificate. In 1965, at the age of 17 he went to Parbatya Chattal Bouddha Anath Ashram (Chittagong Hill Tracts Buddhist Orphanage) at Boalkhali, Dighinala built and managed by its Chief Abbot Jnanashree Mahathera. During his stay at this orphanage he completed his Secondary School Certificate examination from Dighinala High School in 1968. In the same year he ordained higher ordination as Bhikkhu.

In 1969, he went to Mirzapur Shantidam Vihara in Chittagong for higher education. He studied his Higher Secondary School Certificate at Nazirhat Degree College and then Hathazari College from where he successfully completed his HSC degree in 1972. In 1977 and 1978 he successfully completed his BA(Hons) and MA in Bengali Literature from the University of Chittagong. He also did M.A. in Pali Literature from the Dhaka University in 1980.

== Work ==
=== Social service and education ===
In 1974, while he was studying in the University of Chittagong, he took the charge of General Secretary of the Parbatya Chattal Bouddha Anath Ashram (PCBAA). In the same year, he began to establish another orphanage at Rangapani of Rangamati named Moanoghar with guidance and advice of his preceptor Jnanashree Mahathera, the founder and Chief Abbot of the Boalkhali Dashabal Raj Vihara and the Parbatya Chattal Bouddha Anath Ashram, and in consultation with some monks and lay devotees. To provide modern education to the orphan and destitute children he established the Moanoghar High School in 1980.

The Moanoghar NGO and Moanoghar Children's Home are situated in Rangamati Municipality. The Moanoghar Children's home is an institution developing human resources in Chittagong Hill Tracts. Mahathera served as the general secretary of this children's home from 1974 to 2008. He served as the general secretary of the Parbatya Chattal Bouddha Anath Ashram from 1974 to 1986. In 1980, he founded Moanoghar Onath Ashram Abasik Bidyalay ("Moanoghar Residential School") in Rangapani, Rangamati and Anath Ashram Abasik Uccha Bidyalay ("Orphanage Residential High School") at Boalkhali under Dighinala Upazila in the Khagrachhari District of Bangladesh. He served as the Chairman of the Managing Committee of the Schools from 1986 to 2008.

==== Institutions established and run ====
- The Ananda Vihara Pali College (Estd.1980), an institution of excellence in the Tripitaka education in Pali.
- The Moanoghar (Onath Ashram Abashik Uccha Bidyalay) (Estd. 1980), Rangapani, Rangamati. This school is playing a major role to promote and spread general and Buddhist education in Chittagong Hill Tracts.
- The Moanoghar Pali College (Estd. 1981), Rangapani, Rangamati, an institution of excellence in the Tripitaka education in Pali.
- The Moanoghar Karigari Bidyalay (Estd. 1983), Rangapani, Rangamati for Self-employment for the residential drop out students of the Moanoghar Shishu Sadan.
- The Moanoghar Sangeet Bidyalay (Estd. 1983), Rangapani, Rangamati. This is a music school for the students of the Moanoghar Shishu Sadan.
- The Moanoghar Fine Arts School (Estd.1983). This is for the students of the Moanoghar Shishu Sadan for education in fine arts.
- The Moanoghar Mini Hospital (Estd. 1984), Rangapani, Rangamati, for the all time treatment of the students of the Moanoghar Shishu Sadan & local communities.
- The Banophool Children's Home (Estd.1991), Mirpur-13, Dhaka-1216, a residential hostel for class I-V students.
- The Banophool Primary School (Estd.1992), Mirpur-13, Dhaka-1216, for the residential students of the Banophool Children's Home.
- The Moanoghar Pre-Cadet School (Estd.1992), Rangapani, Rangamati. This is for coaching classes for preparation of students for admission in Cadet Colleges. Many cadet school students are given free coaching here.
- The Adibashi Vasha Shikka Academy (Estd. 2000), Rangapani, Rangamati, a research center for Indigenous languages, literature and culture.
- The Prajna Computer Zone (Estd. 2001), Tabalchari, Rangamati for communication and information Technology.
- The Banophool Adibashi Green Heart College (Estd.2004), Mirpur-13, Dhaka-1216, a college that works as a bridge between the indigenous peoples and the majority Bangalee people of Bangladesh and as a symbol of religious and cultural diversity and communal harmony in the heart of the Capital City Dhaka.
- The Banophool Adibashi Foundation Trust (Estd. 2004), Mirpur-13, Dhaka -1216. This is for establishing and running Banophool Adibashi Green Heart College.
- The Banophool Complex (Estd.1990) based on the Shakyamuni Bouddha Vihara at Mirpur-13, Dhaka -1216. In 2004 the Banophool Adibashi Green Heart College was housed on in the Banophoool Complex. Mahathera has been serving as the chairman of the Banophool Adibashi Green Heart College Governing Body since 2004.

Besides, Mahathera founded Jnana and Prajna Charcha Pathagar (Library for the Practice of Wisdom and Knowledge), Rangamati and Buddha Dharmiya Anchalik Pathagar (Regional Library of Buddhism) at Ananda Vihara.

=== Religious and social reform movement ===
Parbatya Bhikkhu Sangha Bangladesh is the Supreme Sangha Council and the oldest religious organization of the greater Chittagong Hill Tracts. The objective of this organization is to promote and spread the teachings of the great Buddha in Chittagong Hill Tracts as well as in the country for the "happiness and well-being of many". This organization has been playing a unique role in preaching Buddhism and religious reform in Chittagong Hill Tracts. Mahathera served as the general secretary of this organization from 1978 to 1988. He also served as the president of Parbatya Bhikkhu Sangha since 2011 to 2014.

The Parbatya Bouddha Sangha Bangladesh is a Dhaka-based NGO. He took over the charge of the President of this NGO in 1987. He served as its president from the year 1987 to 1995, 1998 to February 2013.

==== Participation in international congregations and conferences ====
Mahathera visited many countries including the India, France, UK, United States, Thailand, Canada, South Korea, Japan, China, Sri Lanka, as the general secretary and chief representative of Moanoghar and Parbattya Chattal Buddhist Orphanage in between 1980 and 1997. Besides, he jointed several international peace conferences-

- Participation in the 60th birth anniversary of His Excellency the king of Thailand King Bhumibol Adulyadej in 1987.
- Securing Membership of Asian Buddhist Congress and first visit to Sri Lanka in 1992.
- Founded Attadeepa foundation, Bangladesh in 1997. This foundation secured membership of Buddha's Light International Association (BLIA) in 1998.
- Participation as a chief representative of Atthadeepa Foundation Bangladesh in the ‘Monastic Seminar and BLIA conference, in Toronto, Canada, in 1998.
- Participation in the 16th, 17th, 18th, 19th, 21st World Fellowship of Buddhists Conference, 1988, 1990, 1992, 1994, 2000.
- Participation in BLIA Executive Seminar for south Asian Members conference, Tokyo, Japan, 2003.
- Participation as a chief representative of Attadeepa Foundation in the BLIA Executive Seminar for South Asia Members conference at Mahendragiri (Odisha), Hyderabad, India, 2004.
- Participation as president of Authadeepa Foundation in World Buddhist Forum conference at Shanghai, China, 2006.
- Participation as Chief representative of Auttadeepa foundation in 2nd Worlds Buddhist Forum conference in Taiwan, 30 March 2009.
- Participation as a chief representative of the People's Republic of Bangladesh in Universal Peace Federation Conference in South Korean, 4 June 2009.
- Participation as the chief representative in the 2nd World Buddhist Forum Conference in China, 4 June 2009.
- Participation in Buddha's Light International Association conference at Fo Guang Shan, Taiwan, 29 September 2009.
- Participation as Chief representative of Parbattya Bouddha Sangha in World Buddhist Brotherhood Sangha conference, Japan, 13 December 2009.
- Participation as Chief representative of Parbattya Bouddha Sangha in the 25th World Buddhists Brotherhood Sangha conference, Sri Lanka, 9 November 2010.
- Participation in 'Conference for World Peace and Reunification Korea' at Seoul, South Korea, 15–18 May 2015.

==== Awards and honors ====
- Korean Buddhists Jogye Order Award- 2000 as a General Secretary of Moanoghar.
- Bouddha Purnima Commemoration and Celebrity Persons Reception Award- 2001.
- Warm Felicitation- 2012 by Shishu Koruna Sangha, Bodhicariya Vihara, Kolkata, India for the welfare and benefit of many people.
- Elder Wise Medal- 2014 from Bangladesh Indigenous Forum as a recognition of his contribution in education, religion and society.
- Deputy Supreme Patriarch, Parbatya Bhikkhu Sangha Bangladesh (2019)
- Honor Award - 2023 by Education Watch (EW).
- Mother Teresa Award - 2025 by Mother Teresa Research Welfare Council.

== Current assignments ==
- Principal, Ananda Vihara Pali College
- Lord abbot, Ananda Vihara, Tabalchari, Rangamati
- Lord Abbot, Shakyamuni Bouddha Vihar, Dhaka
- Member, Bangladesh Sanskrit and Pali Education Board, Dhaka
- President, Auttadeepa Foundation, Bangladesh
- Chairman, Banophool Adibashi Green Heart College, Mirpur-13, Dhaka
- Chairman, Parbattya Chattal Bouddha Onath Ashram, Dhighinala, Khagrachari
- Chairman, Banophool Adibashi Foundation Trust, Mirpur, Dhaka
- President, The Middle Way Trust, Rangamati
- Director, Prajna Computer Zone, Rangamati
- President, Parbatya Chattal Bouddha Anath Ashram Management Committee from 2010
- President, Banophool Adibashi Education Foundation, Dhaka

== See also ==
- Kaptai Dam
- Chakma people
- Bangladesh Bauddha Kristi Prachar Sangha
- Bangladesh Sanskrit and Pali Education Board
- Chittagong Pali College
- Chittagong Hill Tracts conflict
