= Abhijatabhivamsa =

Burmese Buddhist scholar monk (1968–2022)

Ashin Abhijātābhivaṃsa
- အဘိဇာတာဘိဝံသ
- Title: Tipiṭakadhara Dhammabhaṇḍhāgārika (2016)

Personal life
- Born: 29 September 1968 Hsinnin Village, Wetlet Township, Sagaing Division, Burma
- Died: 7 February 2022 (aged 53) Bangkok, Thailand
- Cause of death: Leukemia
- Parents: Tin Ya (father); Nyunt Khin (mother)
- Education: Tipiṭakadhara (2007); Tipiṭakakovida (2010)

Religious life
- Religion: Buddhism
- School: Theravada
- Sect: Shwekyin Nikāya
- Dharma name: Abhijāta
- Ordination: 4 January 1988

Senior posting
- Teacher: Ashin Nārada; Ashin Nandamalabhivamsa

Ashin Abhijātābhivaṃsa (Burmese: အရှင်အဘိဇာတာဘိဝံသ, pronounced [əʃɪ̀ɰ̃ ʔəbḭzàtàbḭwʊ̀ɰ̃θa̰]; 29 September 1968 – 7 February 2022), also known as Sagaing Tipiṭaka Sayadaw (Burmese: စစ်ကိုင်းတိပိဋကဆရာတော်, pronounced [zəɡáɪɰ̃ tḭpḭda̰ka̰ sʰəjàdɔ̀]), was a Burmese Buddhist monk. He was chief abbot of Saddhamma Mānitāyon Monastery in Yangon and abbot of Saddhamma Jotaka Subodhāyon Monastery in Monywa. Being awarded the titles of Tipiṭakadhara and Tipiṭakakovida in 2007 and 2010 respectively, Ashin was the 12th recipient of the title of Tipiṭakadhara Dhammabhaṇḍāgārika.

== Early life and education ==
Abhijātābhivaṃsa, the third of seven siblings, was born on 29 September 1968 (8th waxing day of Thadingyut, 1330 M.E.) in Hsinnin Village, Wetlet Township, to Tin Ya and Nyunt Khin. He was ordained as a novice on 29 November 1979 (11th waxing day of Nadaw, 1341 ME), under the presiding sayadaw of Zabumingala Shweyattha Kyaung, and sent to Mahā Subodhāyon Monastery in Sagaing on 14 December. Ashin received the titles of Sāsanālaṅkāra Thamanegyaw and Sāsanadhaja Dhammācariya since he was a novice.

== Monkhood career ==
On 4 January 1988 (1st waning day of Pyatho, 1349 ME), Ashin was ordained as a monk under the patronage of Ashin Nārada, chief abbot of Mahā Subodhāyon.

Ashin passed all five-level 8026 recitation contents for the Tipiṭakadhara Tipiṭakakovida Selection Examinations, in which he had to show his memory of Tipiṭaka by reciting the Canon without being prompted more than five times in a day, in 2007 and was awarded the title of Tipiṭakadhara (lit. 'Expert in Tipitaka'). After completing all five levels of ideology written exam, he became the holder of the title of Tipiṭakakovida (lit. 'One who is skillful at Tipitaka'), in 2010. In 2016, Ashin was offered the title of Tipiṭakadhara Dhammabhaṇḍāgārika by the Burmese government, and was thereafter known as its 12th recipient in history. In 2012, Ashin was appointed by Ashin Nandamālābhivaṃsa as presiding abbot of Saddhamma Jotaka Subodhāyon Monastery, a monastery, in Monywa, under the governance of Mahā Subodhāyon.

Ashin died of leukemia at Bumrungrad Hospital in Bangkok, on 7 February 2022, at the age of 53. During his years of monkhood, Ashin won a total of 47 achievements, including 10 Dhammācariya and 3 Pali Pāragū degrees.
