= Bimalendra Kumar =

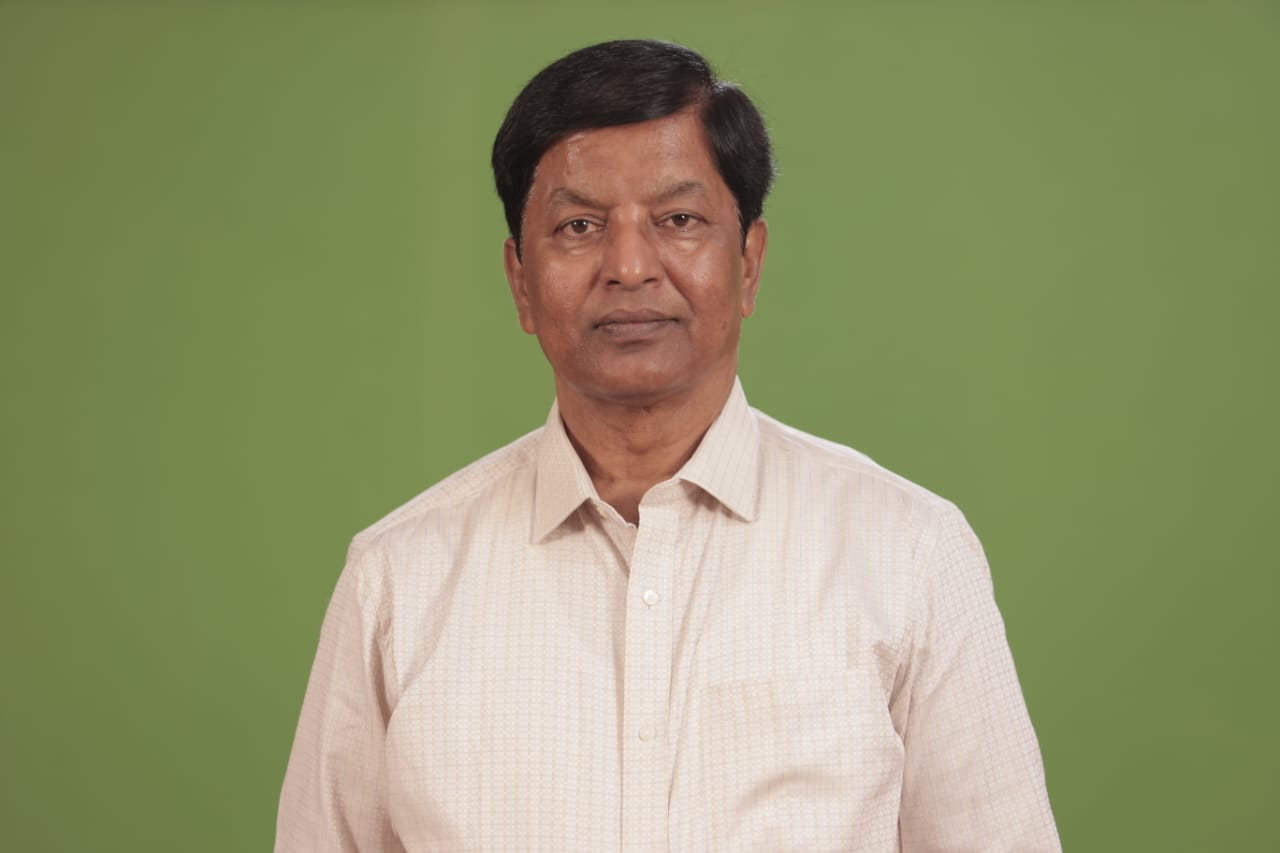
- विमलेन्द्र कुमार

Vice-Chancellor of Sanchi University of Buddhist-Indic Studies
- Incumbent
- Assumed office 1 September 2026
- Preceded by: Shiv Shekhar Shukla

1st ICCR Chair at Lumbini Buddhist University
- In office 5 September 2023 – 30 December 2024

Personal details
- Born: 7 January 1960 (age 66) Madhubani, Bihar, India
- Spouse: Rekha Kumar
- Children: 2
- Education: Doctor of Philosophy (Buddhist Studies

Professor Bimalendra Kumar (विमलेन्द्र कुमार) is an Indian researcher, writer and author of publications who is the current Vice-Chancellor of Sanchi University of Buddhist-Indic Studies (SUBIS). He is also a professor in the department of Buddhist Studies at Lumbini Buddhist University and Banaras Hindu University.

== Education ==
Kumar did his M.A. in Buddhist Studies from Delhi University in 1985; he also got his M.Phil. from Delhi University in 1987. In 1990, Kumar completed his Ph.D. from Delhi University, Delhi. Kumar completed his M.A. in Pali from Magadh University, Bodhgaya, Gaya, in 1991.

== Career and professional activities ==
Kumar began his career as a Lecturer in Indo-Tibetan Studies at Visva-Bharati University, Santiniketan, from 1991 to 1998, before joining Banaras Hindu University (BHU) in Varanasi as a Lecturer in Pali and Buddhist Studies in 1998; he progressed to Reader in 2004, Professor in 2008, and Senior Professor in 2018. He served as Head of the Department of Pali and Buddhist Studies at BHU for two terms (2010–2013 and 2019–2022) and superannuated from the position in January 2025, after which he was appointed Professor of Buddhist Studies at the Lumbini Research Centre, Lumbini Buddhist University, Nepal, in July 2025. From 2023 to 2024, he held the ICCR Ambedkar Chair of Buddhist Studies at Lumbini Buddhist University as a diplomatic assignment under the Indian Embassy in Kathmandu.Throughout his career, Kumar has supervised 35 PhD scholars and organized numerous seminars and conferences in India and Nepal, while serving on editorial boards of research journals and academic bodies such as the governing council of the Central Institute of Higher Tibetan Studies, Varanasi. His international engagements include academic visits to countries like Portugal, the United Kingdom, France, Thailand, Myanmar, Sri Lanka, Nepal, Vietnam, and China.

Kumar's scholarly contributions include editing 19 books on classical Buddhist texts—such as Paṭṭhānuddesadīpani (2005), Bhesajjamañjusā (2015 and 2019 editions), Dīpavaṃso (2019), and Saṅgītiyavaṃso (2021)—and authoring over 125 articles in peer-reviewed journals on topics ranging from the history of Buddhism in regions like Sikkim to Buddha's views on the caste system in Pali literature. Notable recognitions for his work include the ‘Viśeṣa Puruṣkāra’ award from the Governor of Uttar Pradesh in 2015 for contributions to Bhesajjamañjūsā, the ‘Vidvat Bhushan’ honor in 2022 from the Akhil Bharatiya Vidvat Parishad, and the ‘Dr. Bhikshu Dharmarakshita Pali Sammana’ in 2025 from the Pali Society of India. His research output is documented on platforms like Google Scholar, where his publications have garnered citations in Buddhist studies circles, reflecting his influence in editing and interpreting ancient Pali and Sanskrit texts.

== Academic awards ==
- 'Visesa Puruskara by His Excellency Governor of Uttar Pradesh Award' by 'Uttar Pradesh Sanskrit Sansthan' in 2017.
- 'Vidvat Bhushan’ Samman for the contribution to Buddhist Philosophy Award' by 'Akhil Bharatiya Vidvat Parishad, Varanasi' in 2022.
