= Aung Ko =

Aung Ko Oo may refer to:

- Aung Ko Oo (born 1988), Burmese architect, photographer and musician
- Aung Ko Win, Burmese businessman
- Aung Ko (politician) (born 1948), Burmese politician
