= Ashin Nandamālābhivaṁsa =

Burmese Buddhist monk and scholar (born 1940)

Ashin Nandamālābhivaṃsa His Holiness
- နန္ဒမာလာဘိဝံသ
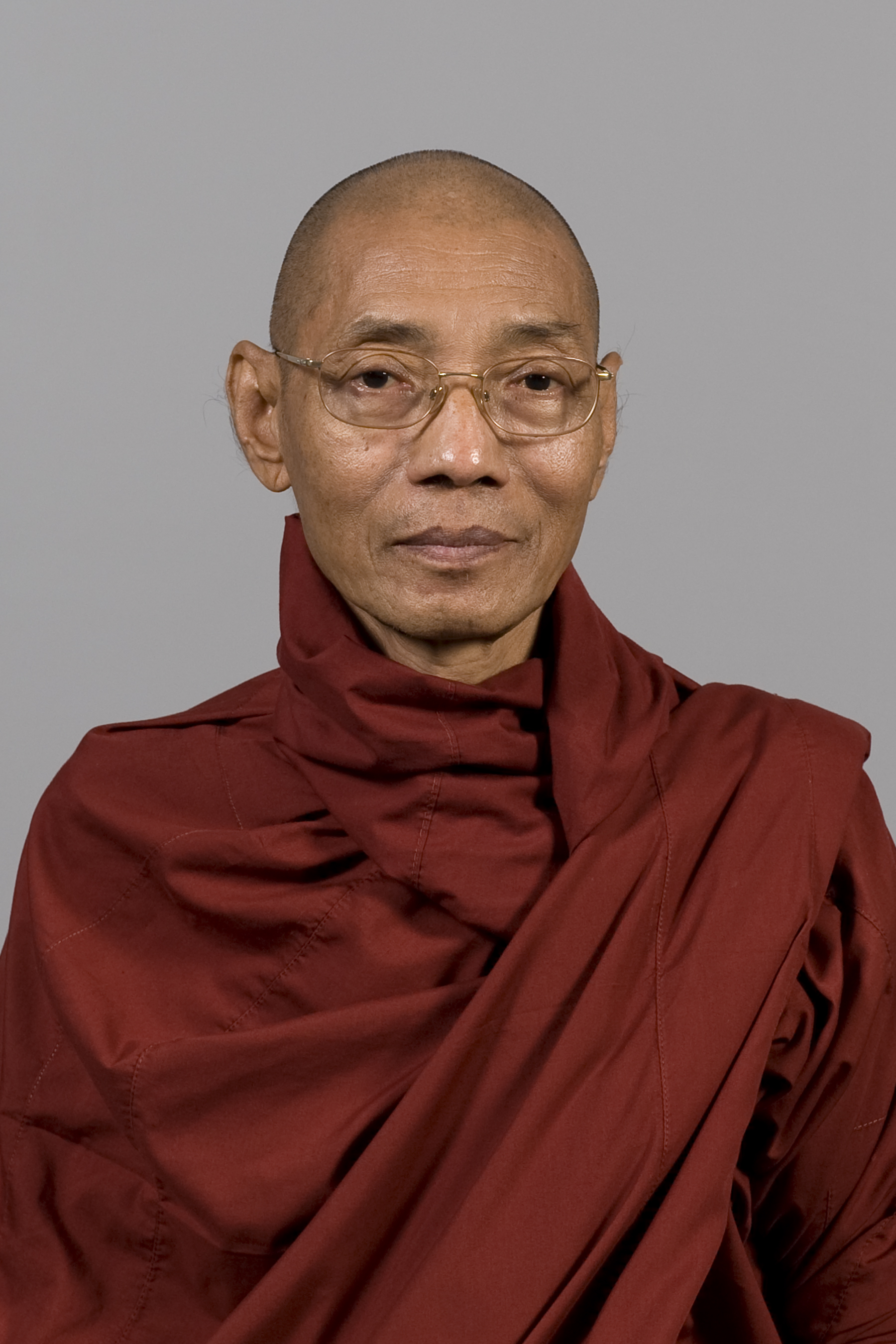
- Portrait of Shwegyin Nikaya Vice Sangharaja Ashin Nandamālāābhivaṃsa
- Title: Abhidhaja Mahā Raṭṭha Guru (2020); Agga Mahā Paṇḍita (2000); Agga Mahā Ganthavācaka Paṇḍita (1996)

Personal life
- Born: Htun Tin; 22 March 1940 (age 86) Nyaungbin Village, Singu Township, Mandalay Division, British Burma
- Parents: San Hla (father); Khin (mother)
- Education: PhD (Buddhist studies) (Magadh University); MA (Buddhist studies) (University of Kelaniya); S.C.G. Dhammācariya (Pāḷi Pārugū)
- Pen name: Ko Mālā; Ko Tula (Sagaing)
- Website: www.drnandamalabhivamsa.com.mm

Religious life
- Religion: Buddhism
- Temple: Mahā Subodhāyon Monastery
- School: Theravada
- Sect: Shwekyin Nikāya
- Dharma name: Nandamāla
- Ordination: 22 April 1959; Sāsana Mañjarī Ordination Hall, Mahāsubodhāyon Monastery

Senior posting
- Teacher: Sankin Sayadaw; Ashin Nārada; Chanmyay Sayadaw
- Period in office: 1995–present (Rector of Sitagu International Buddhist Academy); 2005–2019 (Rector of International Theravada Buddhist Missionary University)
- Predecessor: Established (Rector of SIBA); Ashin Sīlānanda (Rector of ITBMU)
- Successor: Incumbent (Rector of SIBA); Ashin Chekinda (Rector of ITBMU)

Ashin Nandamālābhivaṃsa (Burmese: အရှင်နန္ဒမာလာဘိဝံသ, pronounced [əʃɪ̀ɰ̃ nàɰ̃da̰màlàbḭwʊ̀ɰ̃θa̰]; born 22 March 1940 as Htun Tin, pronounced [tʰʊ́ɰ̃ tɪ̀ɰ̃]), also known as the Rector Sayadaw (Burmese: ပါမောက္ခချုပ်ဆရာတော်, Pamaukkhachoke Sayadaw), is a Burmese Theravada Buddhist monk and scholar specializing in Abhidhamma. He serves as the chief abbot (Note: Pali: padhānanāyaka, Burmese: ပဓာနနာယက, lit. 'principal abbot') of Mahā Subodhāyon Monastery and as rector of the Sitagu International Buddhist Academy.

A recipient of the titles Abhidhaja Mahā Raṭṭha Guru and Agga Mahā Paṇḍita, Nandamālā has served since 2018 as upaukkaṭṭha (Note: Burmese: ဥပဥက္ကဋ္ဌ; associate head) (associate Thathanabaing) and mahānāyaka (Note: Burmese: မဟာနာယက, lit. 'great leader') of the Shwekyin Nikāya, the second-largest monastic order (nikāya) in Myanmar.

Born in Upper Burma, he entered monastic life at age ten in Sagaing under the ninth Thathanabaing of the Shwekyin Nikāya. He passed the Abhidhamma examinations at age thirteen and the state Dhammācariya examinations at sixteen while still a novice. He later earned a master’s degree in Buddhist studies from the University of Kelaniya and a PhD from Magadh University. From 2005 to 2019, he served as rector of the International Theravada Buddhist Missionary University. In 2022, he founded the University of Wisdom Land, where he serves as chancellor.

== Early life and education ==
Nandamālā, the ninth of ten siblings, was born on 22 March 1940 (Note: Full-moon day of Tabaung, 1301 ME) to U San Hla and Daw Khin in Nyaungbin Village, Singu Township, Mandalay Division. One of his elder brothers, Ashin Nārada, later became an upaukkaṭṭha of the Shwekyin Nikāya.

He began his monastic education at the age of five under U Kelāsa of Pawdawmu Monastery in Singu. After Kelāsa's death, he moved to Vipassanā Monastery on Sagaing Hill, where his brother Nārada had resided for seven vassas. He was ordained as a novice in July 1949 (Note: Waso, 1311 ME) under Sankin Sayadaw, the ninth head of the Shwekyin Nikāya. He received the Dhamma name Nandamālā (Burmese: နန္ဒမာလာ), meaning "garland of rejoicing."

All nine surviving members of his family, including his parents, later entered monastic life at Vipassanā Monastery.

== Novicehood ==
At age thirteen, Nandamālā began formal study of the Abhidhamma and the Abhidhammattha saṅgaha under Nārada, passing the three-level Abhidhamma examinations the same year. He subsequently passed the three levels of the Pathamabyan examinations—Pathamange, Pathamalat, and Pathamagyi—in 1954 and 1955.

He achieved first place in all three grades of the Sakyasīha thamanegyaw examinations and was awarded the title Sakyasīha Sāsanālaṅkāra Thamanegyaw, along with the honorific suffix -laṅkāra, at age nineteen.

At sixteen, having passed five subjects in the government-sponsored Dhammācariya examination with distinction in two subjects, he received the title Sāsanadhaja Sirīpavara Dhammācariya. Despite being a novice, he was appointed tutor at Jayamedanī Monastery of Waso Sayadaw, who was the fourteenth thathanabaing of Shwekyin Nikāya, in Mandalay.

On 1 June 1958, (Note: Full-moon day of Nayon, 1320 ME) he and five of his brothers founded Mahā Subodhāyon Monastery in Sagaing. Nārada served as chief abbot, while Nandamālā acted as instructor.

== Early years of monkhood ==
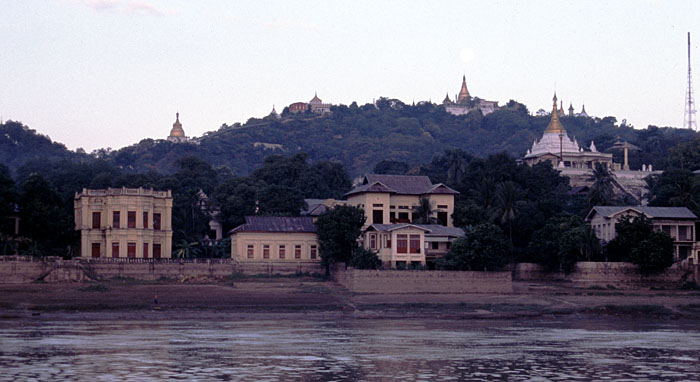
Monastic residents in Sagaing Hill for which Sitagu Yay Ahludaw's water pump installation ran

On 22 April 1959, (Note: full-moon day of Tagu, 1321 ME) with the support (Note: Burmese: စတုပစ္စယ, Pali: Catupaccaya; the four requisites, viz. food, clothing, medicine and lodgings) of Thar Din and Kyin from Mandalay, Ashin was ordained as a monk at the Sāsana Mañjarī Ordination Hall of Mahāsubodhāyon Monastery under the patronage of Sankin Sayadaw.

Nandamālā received the titles Cetiyaṅgaṇa Pariyatti Dhammācariya Gaṇavācaka and Pariyatti Sāsanahita Dhammācariyābhivaṃsa in his 4th (1963) and 6th vassas (1965), respectively, after passing both stages of the Cetiyaṅgaṇa and Sakyasīha examinations. He had passed the remaining four subjects of the government Dhammācariya examination by 1967, (Note: 1329 ME) having earlier received the title Sāsanadhaja Dhammācariya Vinaya Pāḷi Pārugū in 1965 for completing the honours course in Pācityādhi Pāḷi Aṭṭhakathā.

Having passed all three Dhammācariya examination streams—Sakyasīha, Cetiyaṅgaṇa, and the government examination—Nandamālā was awarded the degree of S.C.G. Dhammācariya and granted the suffix -bhivaṃsa. In 1964, he was promoted to chief instructor at the monastery. In 1967, at the age of 26, he joined the project to compile a Tipiṭaka dictionary from Pāḷi into Myanmar and studied English under Chanmyay Sayadaw.

Nandamālā later served as a member of the Sagaing Township Saṅgha Mahā Nāyaka Committee of the Shwegyin Nikāya, which was formed after the First Congregation of All Orders for the Purification, Perpetuation and Propagation of the Sāsanā was held in Rangoon from 24 to 27 May 1980. From 1980 to 1985, he served on committees overseeing various monastic examinations, including the Dhammācariya and Pathamabyan examinations.

In 1980, Nandamālā joined the leading committee of Sitagu Yay Ahludaw, (Note: Burmese: သီတဂူရေအလှူတော်, lit. 'Sitagu water donation') the first project initiated by Sitagu Sayadaw to install a water pump for monastic residents on Sagaing Hill.

For further studies, Nandamālā arrived at Kandi-Myanmar Monastery in Sri Lanka in January 1987 and began a diploma programme at Kelaniya University in July. While writing his master’s thesis, Buddhist Attitude to World Knowledge, for a degree in Buddhist studies, which he completed in 1989, he also delivered lectures on Abhidhamma at the YMBA and at a meditation centre.

== Years as a rector ==
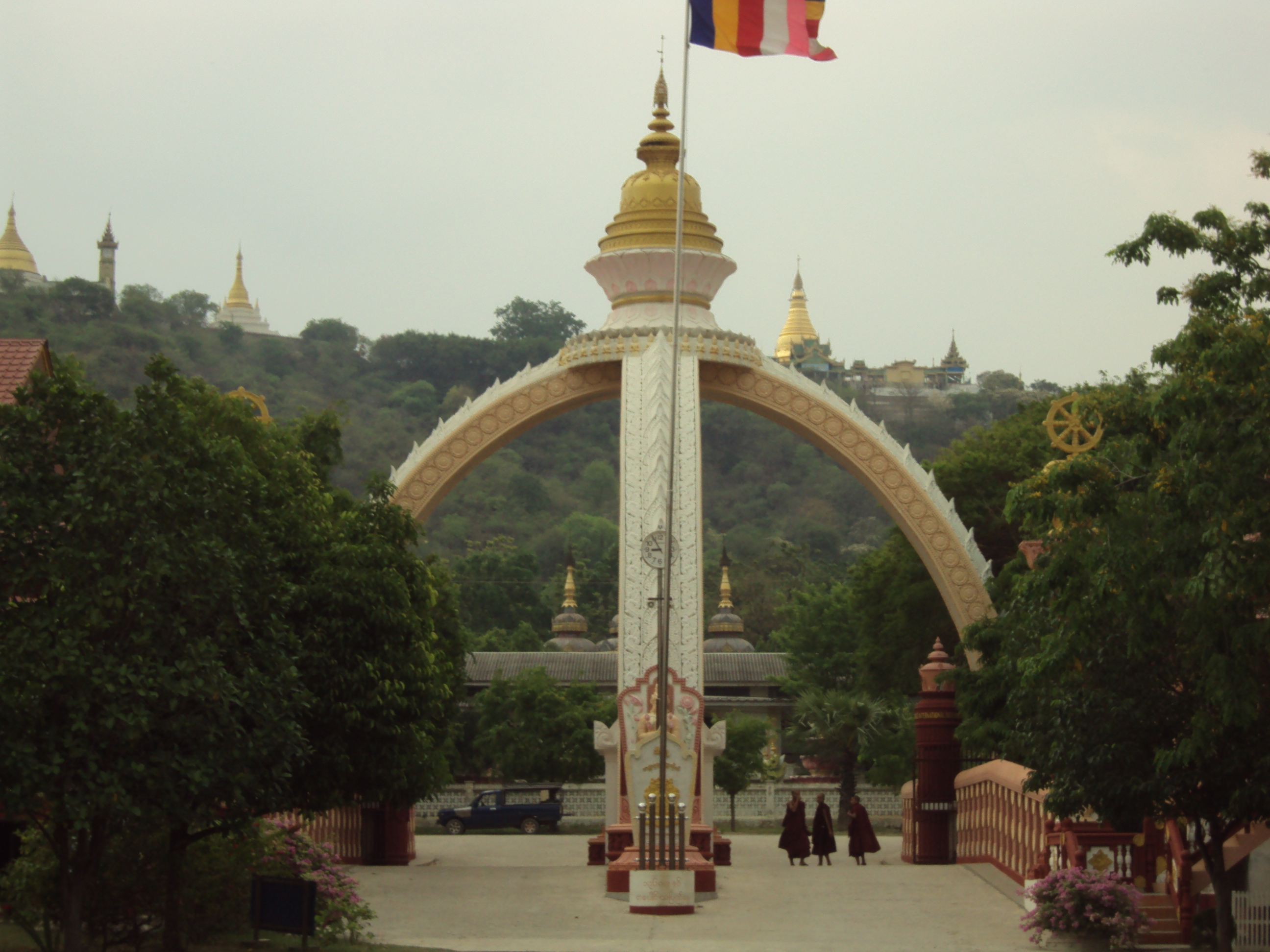
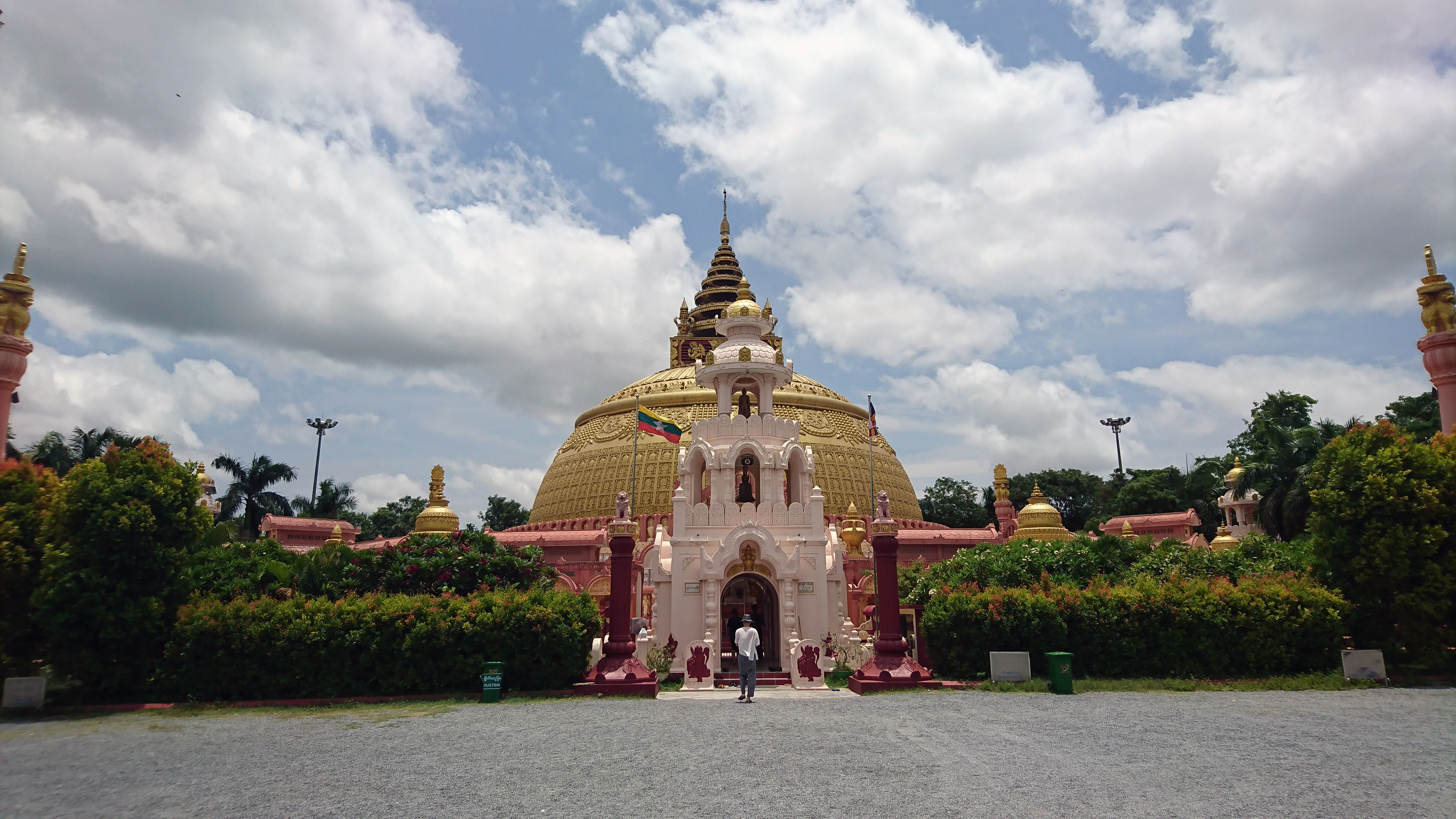
Sitagu International Buddhist Academy at Sagaing Hills

Back in Myanmar in 1994, Nandamālā was appointed administrator at Subodhāyon Monastery. Prior to his return, in August 1994, he delivered lectures on Abhidhamma at Mingalārāma Monastery in Silver Spring, Maryland. When Sitagu International Buddhist Academy was established in 1995, Nandamālā served as rector and taught courses in language and Abhidhamma.

In 1996, the government conferred upon him the title Aggamahāganthavācakapaṇḍita. (Note: Burmese: အဂ္ဂမဟာဂန္ထဝါစကပဏ္ဍိတ, the title offered to the most senior lecturers in monasteries) On 1 January 1998, he served as a Vinayadhara (lit. 'custodian of Vinaya') as a member of the State Independent Vinayadhara Association, a tribunal authorized by the State Sangha Maha Nayaka Committee to oversee alleged violations of the Vinaya by Sangalay Sayadaw.

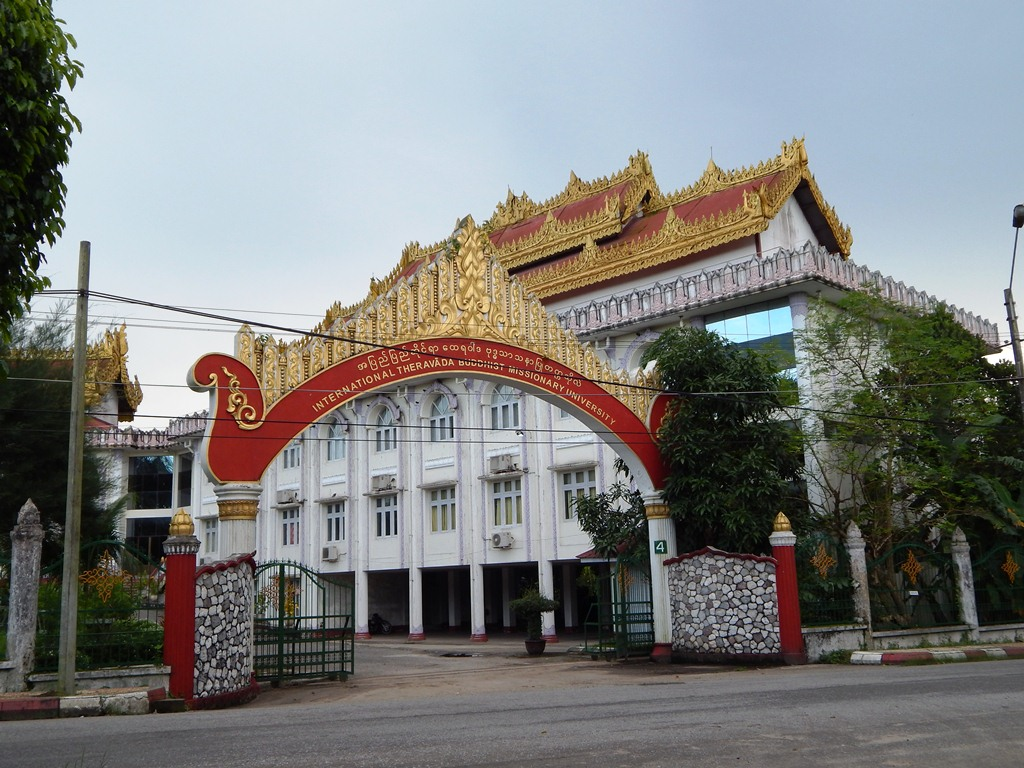
International Theravada Buddhist Missionary University where Nandamālā has served as rector for 14 years

In 1998, when International Theravada Buddhist Missionary University was established, Nandamālā served as a visiting professor, delivering lectures on Abhidhamma at the request of Sitagu Sayadaw. He completed his doctoral thesis, Jainism in Buddhist Literature, at Magadh University in 2003.

Following the death of Ashin Silānadābhivamsa, the first rector of ITMBU, on 13 August 2005 in California, he was appointed rector of the university. He served in that position for approximately fourteen years until his retirement in November 2019 for health reasons. On 1 August 2009, Nandamālā became padhāna-nāyaka (chief abbot) of Subodāyon Monastery following the death of his brother Ashin Nārada.

Nandamālā was awarded the title Aggamahāpaṇḍita in 2000, Aggamahāsaddhammajotikadhaja in 2018, and Abhidhajamahāraṭṭhaguru in 2020. At the 20th All Buddha Sāsana Shwekyin Nikāya Sangha Meeting held in 2018 at Cekindārāma Monastery in Hmawbi, Nandamālā was appointed upaukkaṭṭha (associate Thathanabaing) of the nikāya, alongside Ceeshin Sayadaw, who died in 2023. On 3 December 2022, Nandamālā founded the University of Wisdom Land in Hlegu Township, Yangon, assuming the position of chancellor.
