= Shanti Swaroop Baudh =

Indian Buddhist scholar and Ambedkarite Buddhist activist (1949–2020)

Shanti Swaroop Bauddh
- Born: Gulab Singh; 2 October 1949; Old Delhi, India
- Died: 6 June 2020 (aged 70); New Delhi, India
- Occupations: Buddhist Scholar, Writer, Publisher, Researcher
- Spouse: Married
- Children: Sandeep Shant, Kapil Swaroop Baudh
- Writing career
- Pen name: Baudhacharya (Buddhist teacher)
- Language: Hindi, English
- Notable works: Dhammapada Gatha Aur Katha, Dr. Babasaheb Ambedkar Ki Sangharsh Yatra Aur Sandesh

Baudhacharya Shanti Swaroop Baudh (2 October 1949 – 6 June 2020) was an Indian writer, Buddhist scholar, painter, publisher and Pali language expert. He was an Ambedkarite-Buddhist activist. He was born in 1949 at Old Delhi in a Jatav Dalit family. In 1975, he set up Samyak Prakashan, a publishing house dedicated to Ambedkarite, Navayana Buddhist, Pali literature and Dalit literature. Samyak Prakashan has published over 2000 books many of which have been translated into some 14 different languages including English, Sinhalese, Nepalese, Burmese. He was a board of editors member of Dhamma Darpan and Dalit Dastak magazines. He was Delhi state president of Buddhist Society of India.

== Life ==
Shanti Swaroop Bauddh's name 'Shanti Swaroop' was given by B. R. Ambedkar himself. Shanti Swaroop Bauddh's grandfather Chaudhary Devidas had been associated with Dr. Babasaheb Ambedkar since 1942. Shanti Swaroop Bauddh was born on 2 October 1949, when his name was kept to Gulab Singh. On 4 October 1949, Babasaheb Ambedkar suggested to change the name from Gulab Singh to Shanti Swaroop. At the suggestion of Ambedkar, Chaudhary changed the name of his grandson from Gulab Singh to Shanti Swaroop. After Dr. Babasaheb Ambedkar's initiation into Buddhism, Shanti Swaroop accepted 'Buaddh' (बौद्ध, also transliterated as Buadh) name as his surname. He became a Buddhist inspired by Ambedkar.

Shanti Swaroop Buaddh inherited the Ambedkarite movement from his grandfather Chaudhary Devidas and father Lala Harichand Maurya. His father Lala Harichandra Maurya was a participant in the Ambedkarite movement. Therefore, he was associated with the Ambedkarite movement from his student days. While studying in college, he wrote on Dr. Babasaheb Ambedkar, Buddhism and social issues.

In college days, Shanti Swaroop Buaddh was involved in the 1964 nationwide landless satyagraha movement. After completing his college education, he became active in the Republican Party of India. He has been active in the Buddhist Society of India in the Delhi region since 1970. From 1971 to 1973, he was the president of the Republican Party of India's Delhi region. He was instrumental in the development of the Dr. Babasaheb Ambedkar Bhavan of Delhi. He decided to quit his job as a Gazetted Officer of the government and spread Ambedkar's philosophy i.e. Ambedkarism.

== List of works ==
Shanti Swaroop Baudh wrote 75 books in Hindi, and 43 books in English. His books have been translated in many languages including Marathi, Punjabi, Burmi, Thai etc.

=== Hindi books ===
- Jyotiba Phule Ki Amar Kahani
- Mang-Matang Jati Ke Aadi Purush : Kosalraj Prasenjeet (2018)
- Maharaja Jayachand Gaddar Nahi, Param Deshbhakt Bauddha Raja The (2016)
- Dhammapada Gatha Aur Katha
- Dr. Babasaheb Ambedkar Ki Sangharsh Yatra Aur Sandesh

=== English books ===
- Uttra Nandmata
- Angulimal
- Ananda
- Vishaka
- Mahamaya
- Mahapajapati Gotami
- Cinca
- Upali
- Kisa Gotmi
- Anathpindik
- Suddhodhan
- In The Foot - Step of Buddha
- Pictorial Life of Sakymuni
- Bodhgaya
- Buddha Coloring Book-1
- Buddha Coloring Book-2
- Babasaheb : As I Know Him
- Edwin Arnold On Bodhgaya
- Ramabai Ambedkar
- Dr. Ambedkar Speaks
- Ratthapala
- Kalandaknivapa
- Uppalavanna
- Khujjuttara
- Prakriti : The Candala Maiden
- Yasodhara
- Ambapali
- Bhadra Kundal Kesa
- Khema : The wise one
- Patacara : The Sanghnayika
- Devdatta
- Jeevak
- Suneet
- Purna Thera
- Vidudabha
- Bandhulla Malla
- Vessantara : The Generous One
- Seniya Bimbisar
- Bhagwaan Buddha
- Dhamma Senapati Sariputta
- Sarnath: The Great Holy Place of Buddhists
- Sujata
- Rahula Buddha

=== Other ===
- Goddess English painting

== See also ==
- List of modern scholars in Buddhist studies
- Bhadant Anand Kausalyayan
- Dalit literature
- Navayana (publishing house)
