= Tilak Ram Acharya =

Nepali educator

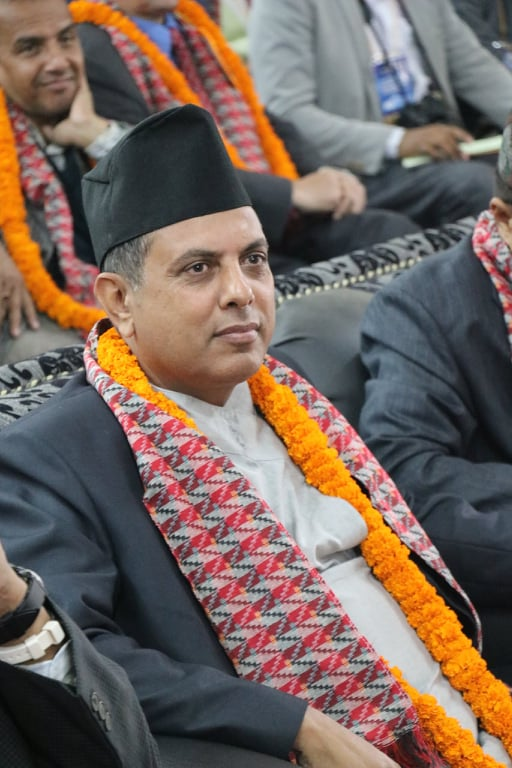
- तिलक राम आचार्य

4th Register of the Lumbini Buddhist University
- In office 2016-ongoing
- In office 14 March 2016 – 4-May-2026
- Preceded by: Dr. Pitambar Lal Yadav

Personal details
- Born: 1 April 1968 (age 58) Arghakhanchi, Nepal
- Citizenship: Nepali
- Spouse: Bishnu Dhungana
- Children: 3
- Education: Doctor of Philosophy (Buddhist Studies)
- Awards: Best Nepal Registrar of the Year 2024
- Website: tilakacharya.com

Tilak Ram Acharya is a Nepali educator and academic administrator, Who is the Advisor of Butwal Sub Metropolitan City. He is the Former registrar of Lumbini Buddhist University. He is also an associate professor in Buddhist studies at Lumbini Buddhist University.

== Early life and education ==
Tilak initially received his bachelor of arts in political science and journalism from Tribhuwan University, Kathmandu in 2000. He then got his Post Graduate Diploma in Buddhist Studies from Tribhuwan University, Kathmandu, in 2003. Tilak completed his Master in Art in Buddhist Studies from Tribhuwan University and got his degree from Tribhuwan University, Kathmandu, Nepal in 2012. Tilak completed his Ph.D. in Buddhist Studies in 2019 at Lumbini Buddhist University, Nepal.

== Career and professional activities ==
Tilak started his career at Lumbini Buddhist University as an Assistant Lecturer in the department of Buddhist studies in 2012. He served as the in-charge of Assistant Campus Chief for a decade his terms from November 27, 2013, to March 13, 2016. Tilak worked as a Lecturer at the Department of Buddhist Studies since June 2016, His academic focus includes Mahayana, Theravada, Vajrayana, and Applied Buddhism. He held the role of Registrar of Lumbini Buddhist University from March 14, 2016, to March 13, 2020, completing one term, and served his second term from March 14, 2020, to June 12, 2024. In his term as the Registrar of Lumbini Buddhist University, He also served as Acting Vice-Chancellor during two periods from 25 October 2017 to 11 February 2018, From 11 February 2023 to 30 August 2023, Tilak started the three-term as the Registrar on June 13, 2024 and Term End 4 May 2026.

== Sources ==
=== Articles of Acharya ===
- THE MAHA BODHI (The International Buddhist Journal) (Vol.135, 2026);Five Precepts as the Foundation of Human Rights: An Analysis,Maha Bodhi International Publication & Media Division, India;ISSN 0025-0406.
- Lumbini Prabha (Vol.11 2026); Influence of Buddhism in the Constitution of Nepal.
- Prajñā Journal of Buddhist Studies(Vol.4 No.4 2024); Investigating Interconnectedness between Buddhist Philosophy and Modern State Governance;
- Prajñā Journal of Buddhist Studies (Vol.3 No.3 2022); The Buddhist Perspective on the Theory of Social Contract.
- Prajñā Journal of Buddhist Studies (Vol. 2 No.2 2021); आधुनिक शक्ति पृथकीकरणको सिद्धान्त र बौद्ध त्रिरत्नको अवधारणा.
- Lumbini Prabha (Vol.5 2020); बौद्ध दृष्टिकोणमा सत्य र अहिंसाको संक्षिप्त विवेचना;
- Prajñā Journal of Buddhist Studies (Vol.1 No.1 2020); लोककल्याणकारी राज्य सम्बन्धी बौद्ध अवधारणा;
- Lumbini Prabha (Vol.4 2019); Back to Early Buddhism: A Look at South East Asia's Historical Exploration;
- Lumbini Prabha (Vol.1 2015); बौद्ध संगीति परम्परा र निकाय भेद;
- Lumbinī darpana (Vol. 1 2015); बौद्ध समाज दर्शनको आधार;Lumbinī vikāsa kōṣa.
- Patrakāritāmā janasaṅgharṣa rajata mahōtsava viśēṣa (Vol.1 2072 BS);विश्वव्यापीकरण र बौद्ध दर्शन;Butwal Media Publications Pvt. Ltd.
- Rupandehi Campus Journal (Vol.4 No.1 2024); Exploration of Pedagogical Approaches during the Buddhist Era; ISSN 2976-1158 eISSN 2976-1166. doi:10.3126/rcj.v4i1.62918
- Lumbini Prabha (Vol.10 2025); A Study of Insights of Teachings Method and Educational Practices in Buddhist Literature; ISSN 2616-0196 eISSN 2717-4603; doi:10.3126/lumbinip.v10i1.78824
- Dhammacakka Journal of Buddhism and Applied Buddhism; Buddha’s Ideas on the Origin of the State: A Comparative Study with Western Theories;ISSN 3059-944X eISSN 3102-0208. doi:10.3126/djbab.v1i2.87323

=== Books of Acharya ===
- बुद्धकालीन सामाजिक, आर्थिक, शैक्षिक, राजनीतिक अवस्था (Ed.1st 2081 BS); लुम्बिनी अनुसन्धान केन्द्र लुम्बिनी बौद्ध विश्वविद्यालय ISBN 978-9937-1-7538-8
- बौद्ध संगिति परमरा र निकाय (Vol.1 2083); लुम्बिनी अनुसन्धान केन्द्र लुम्बिनी बौद्ध विश्वविद्यालय
- बौद्ध आचरण, नैतिकला, करुणा र शान्तिको मार्ग (2083) Publication:विष्णु ढुंगाना
