= Hathazari Government College =

College in Chittagong

Hathazari Government College, Chittagong
- হাটহাজারী সরকারি কলেজ, চট্টগ্রাম
- Type: Public university
- Established: 1968
- Affiliations: National University of Bangladesh
- Principal: Zahid Mahmud
- Students: 7,000
- Location: Hathazari Upazila, Chittagong District, Bangladesh; 22.5020°N 91.8121°E
- Campus: 3.95 acre
- Website: hathazaricollege.edu.bd

Hathazari Government College (Bengali: হাটহাজারী সরকারি কলেজ) is a government-run, honors-level, degree college in Hathazari Upazila, Chittagong District, Bangladesh. It was founded in 1968.

In 2017, the Directorate of Secondary and Higher Education ordered that the college, which had been private, be nationalized.

The campus is located on the south side of the Chittagong-Rangamati Highway in Hathazari.

Total enrollment for the three divisions of the college is 3,375.

== History and Location ==
Hathazari College was established in 1968. The college was nationalized in 2017.

The college is located on 3.95 acres of land on the eastern side of the Chittagong-Rangamati highway in Hathazari Upazila headquarters, near Chittagong city.

== Faculties and departments ==
It is offering higher secondary education in Arts, Commerce and Science under the Chittagong Education Board. It also offers undergraduate and degree (pass) courses under the National University of Bangladesh.

Currently, there are Bachelors (Honors) courses in 5 subjects namely Economics, Political Science, Sociology, Accountancy and Management and Degree (pass) courses in 4 subjects namely BA, BSS, BSC and BBS.

== Notable alumni ==
- Prajnananda Mahathera
