= Aye Myint Kyu =

Burmese general

Thiri Pyanchi Aye Myint Kyu

Minister of Culture of the Republic of the Union of Myanmar
- In office 7 September 2012 – 30 March 2016
- President: Thein Sein
- Preceded by: Kyaw Hsan
- Succeeded by: Aung Ko

Deputy Minister for Hotels and Tourism of the Union of Myanmar

Personal details
- Born: 21 December 1947 (age 78) Minhla, Pegu Division, Burma
- Party: SPDC
- Spouse: Khin Swe Myint
- Occupation: Army Officer
- Nickname: A Ba Kyu

Military service
- Allegiance: Myanmar
- Branch/service: Myanmar Army
- Years of service: – 26 April 2010
- Rank: Brigadier General
- Commands: South (Bago Division)

Brigadier General Aye Myint Kyu (Burmese: အေးမြင့်ကြူ, pronounced [ʔé mjɪ̰ɰ̃ tɕù]; born 21 December 1947) was the Minister of Culture of Myanmar (Burma) and a former deputy minister of Ministry of Hotels and Tourism. He successfully organized the 27th SEA Games opening and closing ceremony as the chairman of the Preparation Committee for the opening and closing ceremony of the 27th SEA Games and showed the Myanmar Culture to the world.

== Biography ==
Aye Myint Kyu was born in Minhla, Bago Division, the son of Thi Han and Kyi Kyi. His wife is Khin Swe Myint. He received a Bachelor of Science degree from Defence Services Academy in 1968.
