= Dhammaduta Chekinda University =

Buddhist missionary university in Auk War Nat Chaung village, Myanmar

Dhammadūta Chekinda University
- ဓမ္မဒူတဆေကိန္ဒတက္ကသိုလ်
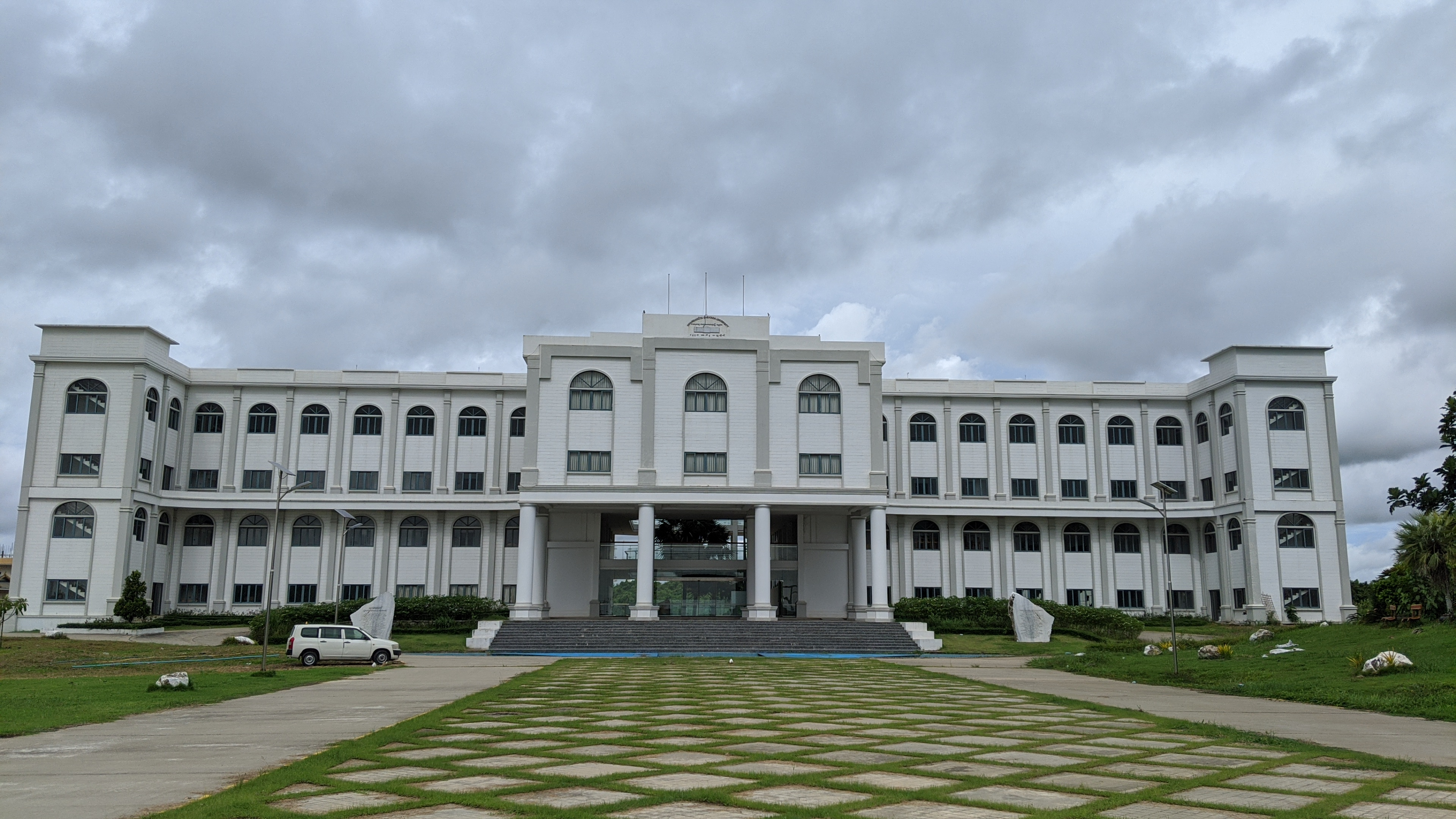
- Type: Buddhist University
- Established: 2017; 8 years ago
- Location: Auk War Nat Chaung village, Hmawbi Township, Yangon Region, Myanmar; 17°08′32″N 96°03′04″E
- Website: www.dcumyanmar.com

The Dhammadūta Chekinda University (Burmese: ဓမ္မဒူတဆေကိန္ဒတက္ကသိုလ်) is a Buddhist missionary university, located in Auk War Nat Chaung village, Hmawbi Township, Yangon Region. It was founded in 2017 by Dhammaduta abbot Dr. Ashin Chekinda and opened on February 24, 2019.

== Departments ==
- Department of Sutta
- Department of Abhidhamma
- Department of Kamma, Meditation
- Department of Buddhist Philosophy
- Department of Pali Literature
- Department of Buddhist History and Culture

== Ovadacariya abbots ==
1. Shwe Kyin Missionary Sayadaw (Vizzar Yone Sayadaw Gyi- Yangon)
2. Bhaddanta Indo Bhasa Bhiwantha (Maha Gandharya Temple - Amarapura)
3. Bhaddanta Nyanitsara (Sitagu Sayadaw - Sagaing)
4. Bhaddanta Agga Nyanabiwantha (Si Shin Sayadaw Gyi- Mandalay)
5. Bhaddanta Nandamala Bhiwantha (Archbishop- Sagaing)
6. Bhaddanta Kosala (Wizzalankara Sayadaw- Mandalay)
7. Bhaddanta Thirinda Bhiwantha (Tipitaka Yaw Sayadaw - Yangon)
8. Bhaddanta Idata Thiri Bhiwantha (Aweyrama Sayadaw Mandalay)
9. Dr. Bhaddanta Sandanathara (Kyaukme Sayadaw - Shan State)
10. Bhaddanta Vayaminda Bhiwantha (Tipitaka Yezakyo Sayadaw - Yangon)
11. Dr. Bhaddanta Adiswantha (International Theravada Buddhist Missionary University - Yangon)
12. Bhaddanta Nyanuttara (Dhammaduta School - InYe)
13. Bhaddantawa Settha Bhiwantha (Ma Soe Rim Temple - Mandalay)

== See also ==
- List of Buddhist universities across the world
