= Sanchi University of Buddhist-Indic Studies =

State university in Madhya Pradesh, India

- Type: Public
- Established: 2013
- Academic affiliations: UGC
- Chancellor: Acharya Prof. (Dr.) Yajneshwar S. Shastri
- Vice-Chancellor: Prof. Bimalendra Kumar
- Location: Sanchi, Madhya Pradesh, India; 23.406°N 77.753°E
- Website: www.sanchiuniv.edu.in

Sanchi University of Buddhist-Indic Studies (SUBIS) is a state university located at Sanchi, Madhya Pradesh, India. It was established in 2013 by the Government of Madhya Pradesh under Sanchi University of Buddhist-Indic Studies Act, 2012. The foundation stone for the university was laid on 21 September 2012 by the president of Sri Lanka Mahinda Rajapaksa among protest by the Marumalarchi Dravida Munnetra Kazhagam, who protested the visit of the Sri Lankan president. Yajneshwar Shastri was appointed as vice-chancellor in July 2016, followed by Neerja Arun Gupta, appointed in February 2022.

== See also ==
- Central Institute of Buddhist Studies, in Leh in Ladakh in India.
- Central Institute of Higher Tibetan Studies, in Varanasi in Uttar Pradesh in India.
- Gautam Buddha University, in Noida in Uttar Pradesh in India.
- Lumbini Buddhist University, in Lumbini in Nepal.
- List of Buddhist universities across the world
