= Ministry of Religious Affairs and Culture (Myanmar) =

Government ministry of Myanmar

- သာသနာရေးဝန်ကြီးဌာန

Ministry overview
- Formed: 1 April 2016; 10 years ago
- Preceding agencies: Ministry of Religious Affairs; Ministry of Culture
- Dissolved: 10 April 2026
- Superseding agencies: Ministry of Religious Affairs; Ministry of Hotels, Tourism and Culture
- Jurisdiction: Government of Myanmar
- Headquarters: Nay Pyi Taw
- Minister responsible: Ko Ko
- Website: www.mora.gov.mm

The Ministry of Religious Affairs (Burmese: သာသနာရေးဝန်ကြီးဌာန) administers the religious affairs, cultural affairs and historical and archaeology research efforts of Myanmar (formerly Burma). The Department of Religious Affairs deals with purification, perpetuation, promotion and propagation of the Theravada Buddhist Sasana and promotes Myanmar traditional customs and culture.

== History ==
The Ministry of Culture was established on 16 March 1952 as the Ministry of Union Cultures, and later renamed the Ministry of Culture on 15 March 1972.

The Ministry of Religious Affairs (MORA) came into being before the Union of Burma (now known as the Republic of the Union of Myanmar) regained its independence in 1947. On 2 March 1962, the Revolutionary Council government reorganised all ministries. MORA became a department of the Ministry of Home and Religious Affairs. On 18 September 1988. the State Law and Order Restoration Council formed the department for the Promotion and Propagation of the Sasana, also under the Ministry of Home and Religious Affairs. On 20 March 1992, the ministries of Home Affairs and Religious Affairs were separated. A cabinet meeting on 26 June 1998 confirmed that the International Theravada Buddhist Missionary University would be formed under MORA.

On 1 April 2016, MORA and the Ministry of Culture were combined to form the Ministry of Religious Affairs and Culture, as part of a government downsizing.

In 2026, after the elections of 2025 to 2026, the Ministry of Religious Affairs and Culture was split into the Ministry of Religious Affairs while the "culture affairs" part of the ministry was merged with the Ministry of Hotels and Tourism to form the Ministry of Hotels, Tourism and Culture.

In August 2026, Min Aung Hlaing, now President of Myanmar, filed a notion to rename the Ministry of Hotels, Tourism and Culture to the Ministry of Culture, Hotels and Tourism through Order No. 5/2026. In September, following a debate in the Pyidaungsu Hluttaw, the Pyidaungsu Hluttaw approved the name change.

== Departments ==
- Union Minister Office
- Department of Religious Affairs
  - To ensure that all people living in the Union of Myanmar can freely believe in any religion and freely practice that religion.
  - Since the great majority of the people are Buddhist, to purify, perpetuate and propagate the three kinds of Sasana of the Buddha namely, Pariyatti, Patipatti, and Pativedha.
  - To preserve and promote the traditional and cultural heritage of Myanmar.
- Department for Promotion and Propagation of Sasana - Responsible for supporting missionary activity within Myanmar and abroad. It also undertakes translation of Pitakas and compilation of Buddhist Treatises
  - State Pariyatti Sasana University, Yangon
  - State Pariyatti Sasana University, Mandalay
- International Theravada Buddhist Missionary University
- Department of Archaeology and National Museum
- Fine Arts Department
- Department of Historical Research and National Library - publishes the Myanmar Historical Research Journal
- National University of Arts and Culture, Yangon
- National University of Arts and Culture, Mandalay

== Publications ==
Myanmar Historical Research Journal
- Discipline: Burmese history
- Language: Burmese

Publication details
- History: 1995–present
- Publisher: Ministry of Religious Affairs and Culture (Myanmar)
- Frequency: Biannual

Standard abbreviations
- ISO 4: Myanmar Hist. Res. J.

Indexing
- OCLC no.: 46428663

The ministry's department of historical research, in collaboration with the National Library of Myanmar and the Myanmar Historical Commission, publishes the biannual Burmese language Myanmar Historical Research Journal (Burmese: မြန်မာသမိုင်းသုတေသနစာစောင်), an academic journal covering the history of Myanmar.

== Ministers ==
| No | Name | Start date | End date | Ministry/Department | Cabinet |
|---|---|---|---|---|---|
| 1 | U Tun Phay | 16 March 1952 | 12 August 1953 | Department of Union Culture | |
| 2 | General Khin Maung Lay | 12 August 1953 | 5 September 1953 | Ministry of Home Affairs and Union Culture | |
| 3 | U Win | 5 September 1953 | 17 November 1955 | Department of National Planning and Union Culture | |
| 4 | U Tun Tin | 12 June 1956 | 25 February 1957 | Department of Education and Union Culture | |
| 5 | U Tun Tin | 1 March 1957 | 18 July 1958 | Department of Education and Union Culture | |
| 6 | Thakin Tin | 18 July 1958 | 28 October 1958 | Department of Mechanized and Union Culture | |
| 7 | U Maung Kyaw Zan | 28 July 2005 | 28 October 1958 | Department of Education and Union Culture | |
| 8 | U Chit Thaung | 28 October 1958 | 4 April 1960 | Department of Union Culture | |
| 9 | U Ba Saw | 4 April 1960 | 2 March 1962 | Department of Social Welfare, Religious Affairs, Union Culture and Health | |
| 1. | Col Saw Myint | 2 March 1962 | 17 August 1964 | Department of Information and Union Culture | |
| 11 | Col Thaung Dan | 17 September 1964 | 2 March 1974 | Ministry of Information, Ministry of Culture and Social Welfare | |
| 12 | U Aye Maung | 2 March 1974 | 1 March 1987 | Ministry of Culture | |
| 13 | U Mya Maung | 2 March 1979 | 20 March 1979 | Ministry of Culture and Ministry of Information | |
| 14 | U Man San Myat Shwe | 20 March 1979 | 16 October 1980 | Ministry of Culture and Ministry of Information | |
| 15 | U Aung Kyaw Myint | 16 October 1980 | 18 September 1988 | Ministry of Culture and Ministry of Information | |
| 16 | Gen Phone Myint | 21 September 1988 | 6 March 1992 | Ministry of Culture and Ministry of Information | |
| 17 | Lt Gen Kyaw Yair Aung | 6 March 1992 | 20 June 1995 | Ministry of Culture | |
| 18 | Col Thaung Myint | 20 June 1995 | 29 May 1996 | Ministry of Culture | |
| 19 | U Aung San | 29 May 1996 | 20 December 1997 | Ministry of Culture | |
| 20 | U Win Sein | 26 December 1997 | 9 November 2001 | Ministry of Culture | |
| 21 | U Tin Win | 15 November 2001 | 12 September 2002 | Ministry of Culture, Ministry of Labour | |
| 22 | Gen Aung Kyi | 13 September 2002 | 15 May 2006 | Ministry of Culture | |
| 23 | Col Khin Aung Myint | 15 May 2006 | 29 March 2011 | Ministry of Culture | |
| 24 | U Kyaw San | 30 March 2011 | 27 August 2012 | Ministry of Culture and Ministry of Information | |
| 25 | U Aye Myint Kyu | 7 September 2012 | 30 March 2016 | Ministry of Culture | Thein Sein |
| 26 | U Aung Ko | 30 March 2016 | 31 January 2023 | Ministry of Religious Affairs and Culture | Htin Kyaw |
| 27 | U Tin Oo Lwin | | | Ministry of Religious Affairs | Min Aung Hlaing |

== See also ==
- Agga Maha Pandita
- List of Sāsana Azani recipients
- State Sangha Maha Nayaka Committee
- International Theravada Buddhist Missionary University
- State Pariyatti Sasana University, Yangon
- State Pariyatti Sasana University, Mandalay
- Culture of Burma
- Cabinet of Myanmar
- National University of Arts and Culture, Mandalay
- National University of Arts and Culture, Yangon
