= Aung Ko (politician) =

Burmese politician

His Excellency Thura Aung Ko
- အောင်ကို
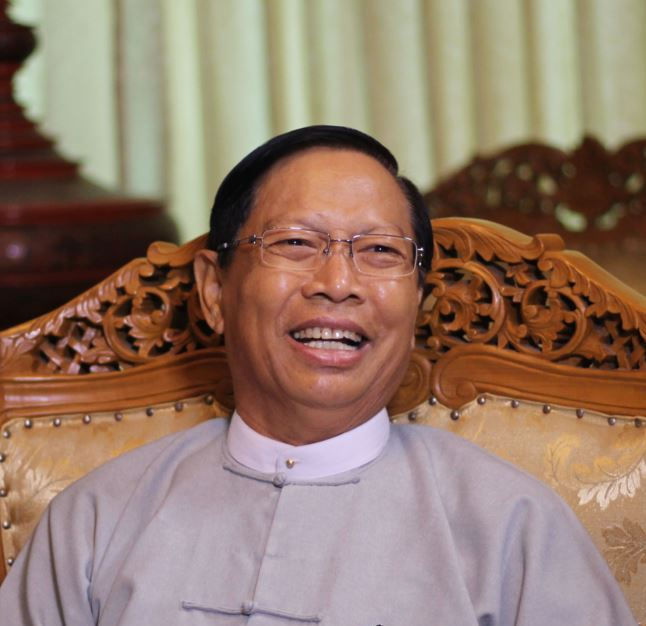
- Aung Ko in 2018

Minister for Religious Affairs and Culture
- Incumbent
- Assumed office 30 March 2016
- President: Htin Kyaw; Myint Swe (acting); Win Myint
- Preceded by: Soe Win (Religious Affairs); Aye Myint Kyu (Culture)

Member of the Pyithu Hluttaw
- In office 30 March 2011 – 29 January 2016
- Constituency: Kanpetlet Township

Deputy Minister for Religious Affairs

Personal details
- Born: 4 January 1948 (age 78) Kyaukpadaung, Mandalay, Burma
- Party: USDP (2010–2016); Independent (2016–present)
- Spouse: Myint Myint Yee
- Children: 3

Military service
- Allegiance: Myanmar
- Branch/service: Myanmar Army
- Years of service: 1969–1997
- Rank: Brigadier-general

Thura Aung Ko (Burmese: အောင်ကို [àʊɴ kò]; born 4 January 1948) is a Burmese politician and the former Minister of Religious Affairs and Culture in the Cabinet of President Htin Kyaw. Aung Ko is a former senior member of the Union Solidarity and Development Party and was a member of the House of Representatives from 2010 to 2015. and he turn into allie with National League of Democracy after winning landslide victory of 2015 General Election.

== Early life and education ==
Aung Ko was born on 4 January 1948 to Ba Zan and Tin Shwe in Kyaukpadaung Township, Mandalay Division, Burma (now Myanmar).

== Member of parliament ==
A former Brigadier-General, Aung Ko was a member of the Central Executive Committee of the Union Solidarity and Development Association from 1997. He was noted as the Deputy Minister for Religious Affairs in 2003, when he was included in an EU sanctions list, and in 2007, when he was included on an Australian sanctions list.

Aung Ko was elected to the House of Representatives in 2010, the first election held in Myanmar since 1990. The military-linked USDP won 80% of the seats while the opposition National League for Democracy boycotted the election. He was elected MP for Kanpetlet township in Chin State.

Aung Ko became the Chairman of the parliament's Judicial and Legislative Committee. He pledged to "wipe out" the problem of biased judges who followed verbal orders from their superiors and "held back democracy". He drafted a law to allow for the prosecution of corrupt judges and encouraged the public to submit biased cases for review.

He pushed for an amendment to the law on protests to remove the requirement to seek permission from the local police and local government, and to remove jail sentences for violating the law. The final version of the law retained the requirement that permission for protests be obtained—though it now specified that this permission could only be refused on "'reasonable' grounds"—and cut the maximum jail term to six months.

Aung Ko also complained that corrupt court officials took advantage of the long delays in the court system to profit from land disputes. Myanmar needed to "create a new society based on the rule of law".

Following inter-religious violence in Mandalay in 2014, he admitted that few MPs "dare to talk about" the conflicts because of the sensitivities. "This case is wedged between international and national opinion ... It is a very important issue for the country but I have to be silent for now".

He contested the Kanpetlet township in Chin State in the 2015 election, but he lost his seat to the NLD, who won 7 of the 9 seats in the state.

On June 20, 2018 he complained "that he was facing challenges that were visible and those that were not." The article says that "U Aung Ko has tried to take action against U Wirathu, a leading member of Ma Ba Tha, an extremist Buddhist monk group accused of hate speech against Muslims." The article mentions the army as a force against legal actions against U Wirathu.

=== Extreme religion comment ===
In November 2018, Ko told monks during the funeral of a prominent Buddhist monk in Karen State on Nov. 27 that the followers of an extreme religion take three or four wives and have families with 20 children, while "we Buddhists" practice monogamy and raise families with one or two children.

Ko would later add that if the trend continued the proportion of Buddhists in the country would decline. “Devotees of other religions will become the majority and we will be in danger of being taken over,”.

== Minister ==
Under Senior General Than Shwe, he was the Deputy Minister for Religious Affairs (under the minister Myint Maung) and a member of the USDP's Central Executive Committee. He was elected as one of the party's three secretaries in 2012. He was a key ally of U Shwe Mann, the speaker of the House of Representatives. Shwe Mann and Aung Ko were removed from the party leadership in August 2015 before the election.

After the 2015 election he reportedly resigned from the USDP and was said to be "close" to Aung San Suu Kyi, the leader of the victorious NLD. He was promoted to Minister for Religious Affairs and Culture, which merged the Ministry of Religious Affairs and the Ministry of Culture, as one of only two USDP ministers in the cabinet of NLD President Htin Kyaw.

Aung Ko was one of the key players in disbanding the Ma Ba Tha, an ultra nationalist Buddhist organisation, which frequently supported the military and set out, at an interfaith occasion held in January 2020, the reason why elusive nationalists such as Wirathu could not be arrested was that the elected civilian government did not command the police force which is a department of the Ministry of Home Affairs, which is under control of the military. Regarding his very speech, the military spokesperson Zaw Min Tun asked the government to take action against him in February 2020.

== Corruption charge ==
After the military takeover, on 5 March 2021 he was indicted on charges of corruption; giving religious titles to individuals in exchange for bribes. It was the anti-corruption commission that filed lawsuits against him in that he might be sentenced up to 15 years in prison for infringement of anti-corruption law. He was released under an amnesty in January 2023.

== Personal life ==
Aung Ko is married to Myint Myint Yi, a retired teacher, and has three children, Hnin Zabe Aung, Pale Aung, and Thant Zin.
