= Ashin Chekinda =

Burmese Theravada Buddhist monk

Chekinda
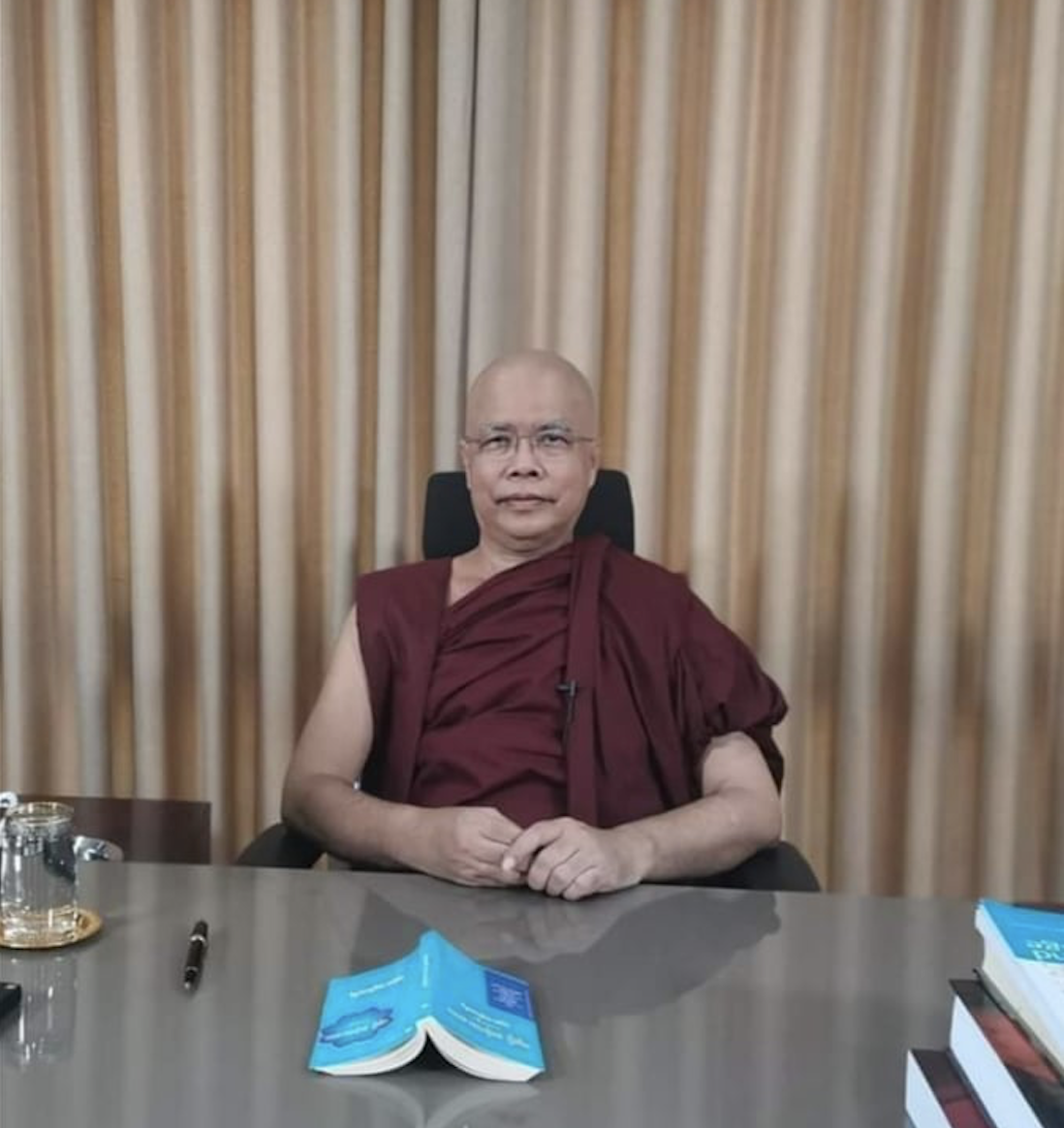
- Title: Ashin

Personal life
- Born: 28 January 1958 (age 68) Sagaing Sagaing Region, Burma
- Occupation: Buddhist monk

Religious life
- Religion: Buddhism
- School: Theravada
- Lineage: Shwegyin Nikaya
- Dharma names: Chekinda ဆေကိန္ဒ

Ashin Chekinda (Burmese: အရှင်ဆေကိန္ဒ; also known as Dhammadūta Ashin Chekinda) is a Theravada Buddhist monk from Myanmar (Burma). Following the 2021 Myanmar coup d'état, Ashin Chekinda's public profile has increased, due to his close relationship with Min Aung Hlaing. In 2022, he was promoted to a rector of the International Theravada Buddhist Missionary University in Yangon. He founded the Dhammaduta Chekinda University and is known for his summer school programs that attract Burmese youth.
