= State Pariyatti Sasana University, Yangon =

Higher education institute in Yangon, Myanmar

State Pariyatti Sāsana University, Yangon
- နိုင်ငံတော် ပရိယတ္တိသာသနာ့ တက္ကသိုလ်(ရန်ကုန်)
- Motto: သဗ္ဗဒါနံ ဓမ္မဒါနံ ဇိနာတိ sabbadānaṃ dhammadānaṃ jināti
- Type: Public
- Established: 26 June 1986; 40 years ago
- Affiliations: Ministry of Religious Affairs and Culture (Myanmar)
- Location: Yangon, Yangon Region, Myanmar; 16.855641°N 96.153273°E
- Website: spsuygn.edu.mm

State Pariyatti Sāsana University, Yangon (Burmese: နိုင်ငံတော် ပရိယတ္တိသာသနာ့ တက္ကသိုလ် (ရန်ကုန်)) is a Buddhist university located in Yangon, Myanmar, which teaches members of the Buddhist sangha, specifically in the Pitaka, Pali, Burmese language and Burmese literature, and missionary work. The university was opened on 26 June 1986.

The university offers Bachelor of Arts (Sāsanatakkasīla Dhammācariya) and Master of Arts (Sāsanatakkasīla Mahādhammācariya) degrees, which are conferred as Burmese Buddhist titles. In 2018, 128 titles were conferred to Buddhist monks.

== See also ==
- List of Buddhist universities across the world
