= Sitagu International Buddhist Academy =

Sitagu International Buddhist University သီတဂူကမ္ဘာ့ဗုဒ္ဓတက္ကသိုလ်
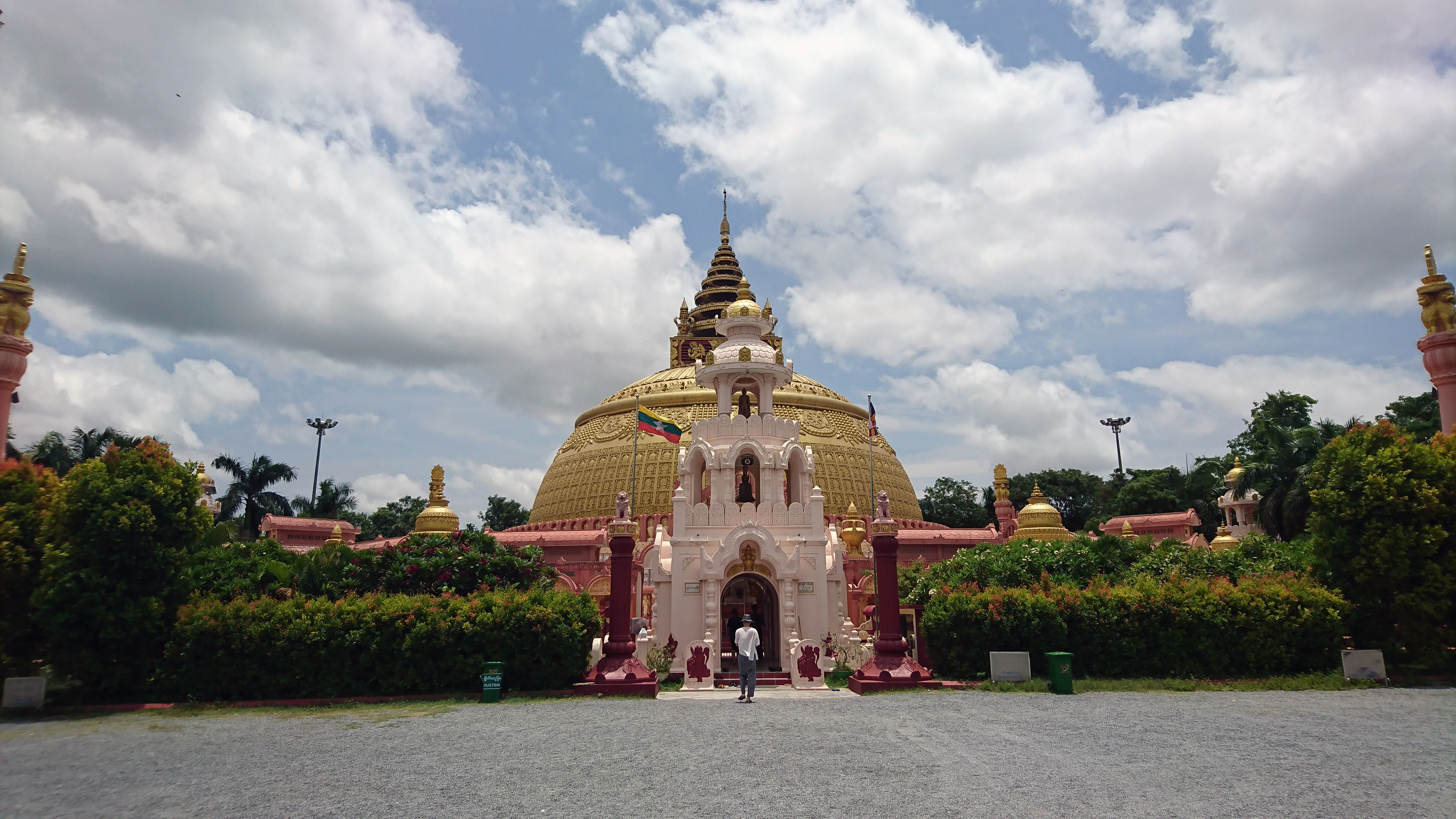
- Type: Public
- Established: 1994
- Founders: Bhaddanta Nyanitsara
- Rector: Ashin Nandamalabhivamsa
- Location: Sagaing, Sagaing Region, Myanmar; 21°54′06″N 95°59′09″E
- Language: English; Pali; Sanskrit; Hindi
- Website: https://www.thesitagu.org/

The Sitagu International Buddhist Academy (Burmese: သီတဂူကမ္ဘာ့ဗုဒ္ဓတက္ကသိုလ်) is a Buddhist missionary university, located in Sagaing, Myanmar. Founded in 1994 by Sitagu Sayadaw Ashin Nyanissara, the academy specializes in the teaching of Buddhist literature, as well as in the training of monks and nuns.

== History ==
Construction of the Sitagu International Buddhist Academy began in 1984, under the direction of the Sitagu Association.

== Location ==
The university is situated just beneath the Sun U Ponnyashin Pagoda in the narrow plain separating the westernmost spur of the Sagaing Hills and the Minwun ridge. There six-building complex is equipped with classrooms, offices, a research centre, meditation centres, libraries and a number of multipurpose halls.

== Programs ==
The academy offers the following diploma and degree programs:

- Diploma in Language Studies (English, Pali, Sanskrit, or Hindi)
- Diploma in Buddhist Studies
- B.A. in Buddhist Studies
- M.A. in Buddhist Studies
- Ph.D. in Buddhist Studies

== See also ==
- List of Buddhist universities across the world
