= State Pariyatti Sasana University, Mandalay =

Higher education institute in Mandalay, Myanmar

Coordinates: 22.001094°N 96.115394°E

- နိုင်ငံတော် ပရိယတ္တိသာသနာ့ တက္ကသိုလ် (မန္တလေး)
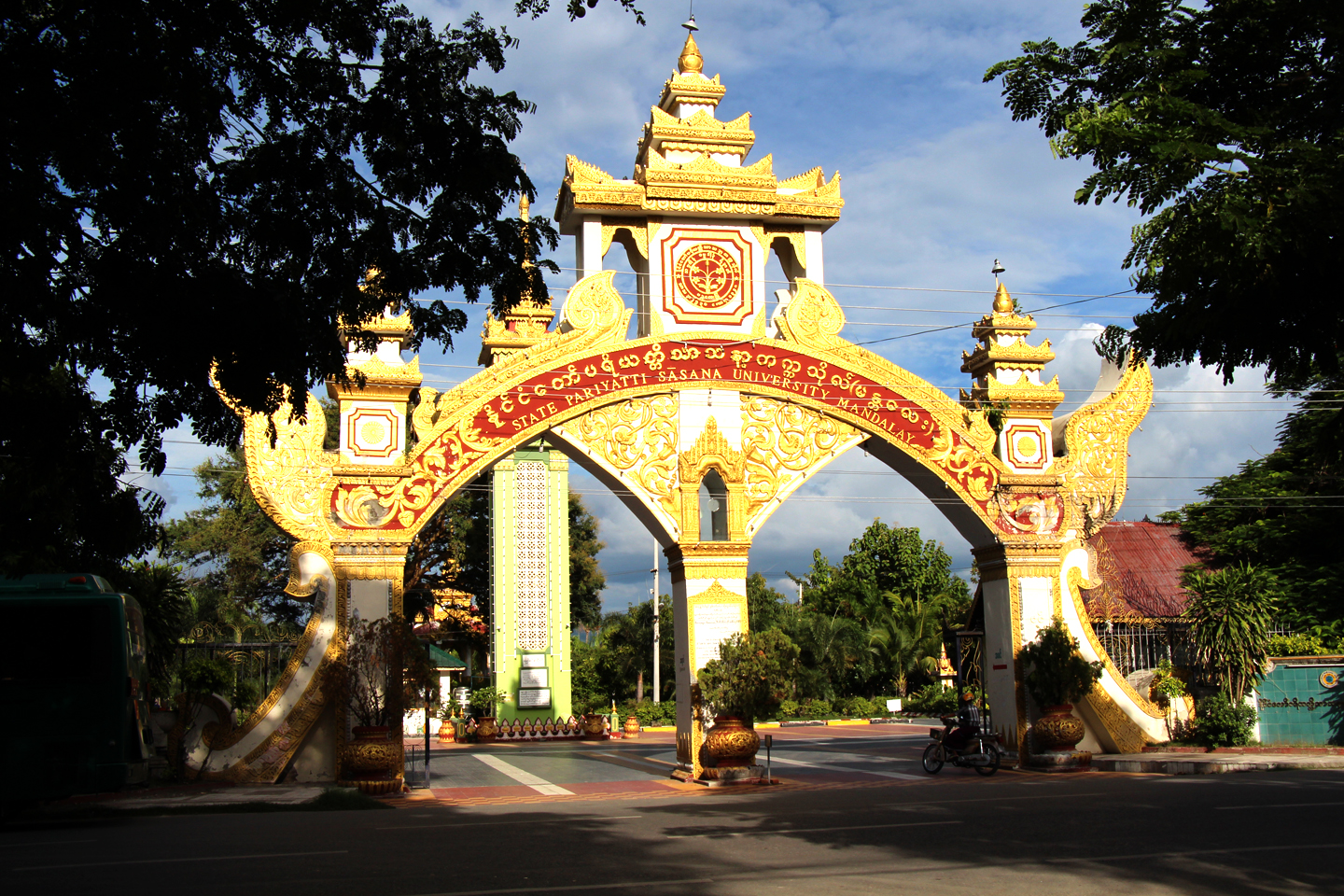
- Other name: SPSU
- Motto: သဗ္ဗဒါနံ ဓမ္မဒါနံ ဇိနာတိ sabbadānaṃ dhammadānaṃ jināti
- Type: Public
- Established: 21 August 1986; 40 years ago
- Affiliations: Ministry of Religious Affairs and Culture (Myanmar)
- Chancellor: Bhaddanta Kesarājā
- Students: 442
- Location: 62 Street, Mandalay, Mandalay Region, Myanmar

The State Pariyatti Sasana University, Mandalay (Burmese: နိုင်ငံတော် ပရိယတ္တိသာသနာ့ တက္ကသိုလ် (မန္တလေး)) is a Buddhist university located in Mandalay, Myanmar, which teaches members of the Buddhist sangha, specifically in the Pitaka, Pali, Burmese language and Burmese literature, and missionary work. The university was opened on 21 August 1986. The university offers Bachelor of Arts (Sāsanatakkasīla Dhammācariya), Master of Arts (Sāsanatakkasīla Mahādhammācariya) and Ph.D (Sāsanatakkasīla Dhammapāragū) degrees, which are conferred as Burmese Buddhist titles. In 2018, 51 titles were conferred on Buddhist monks.

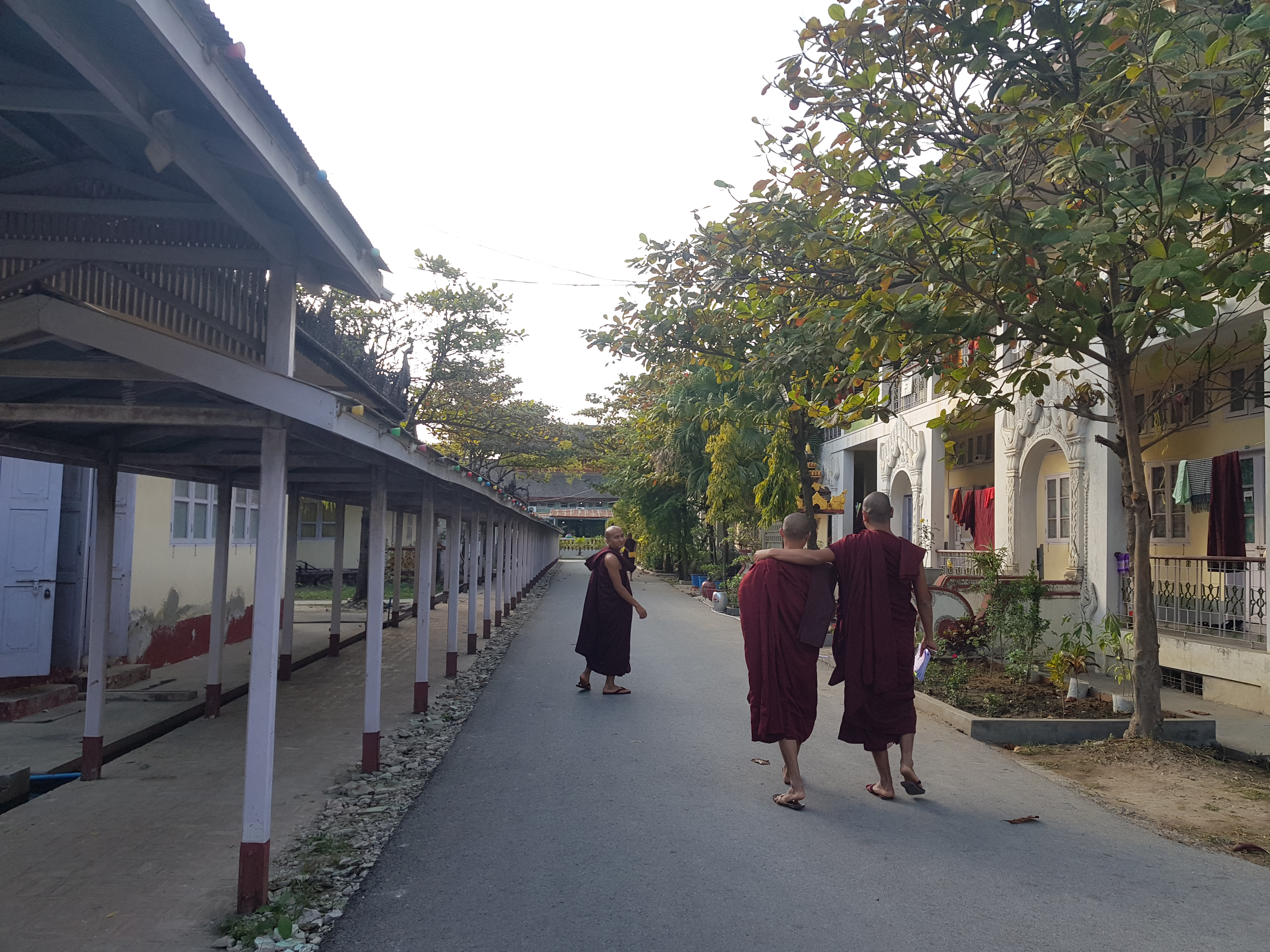

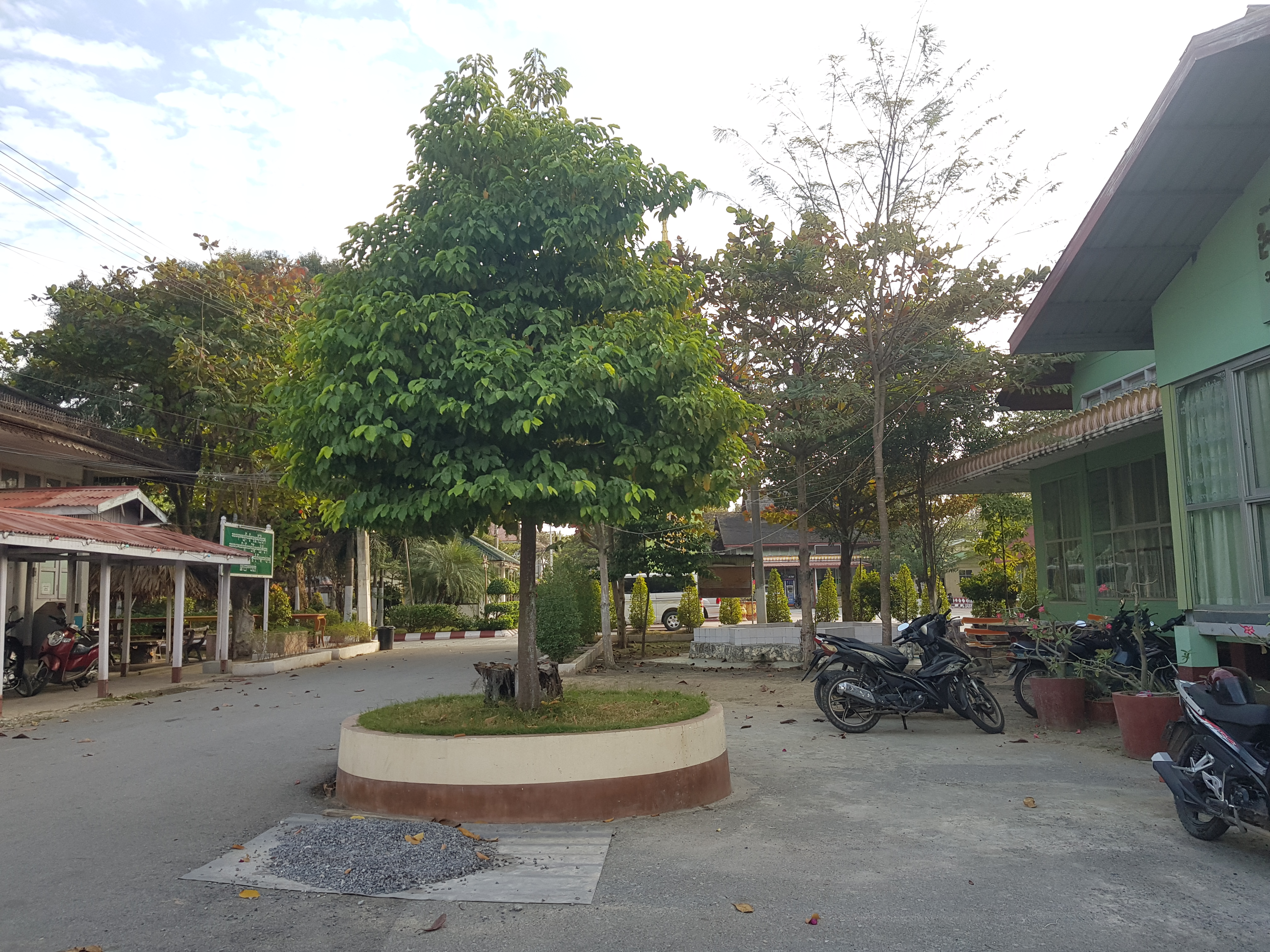

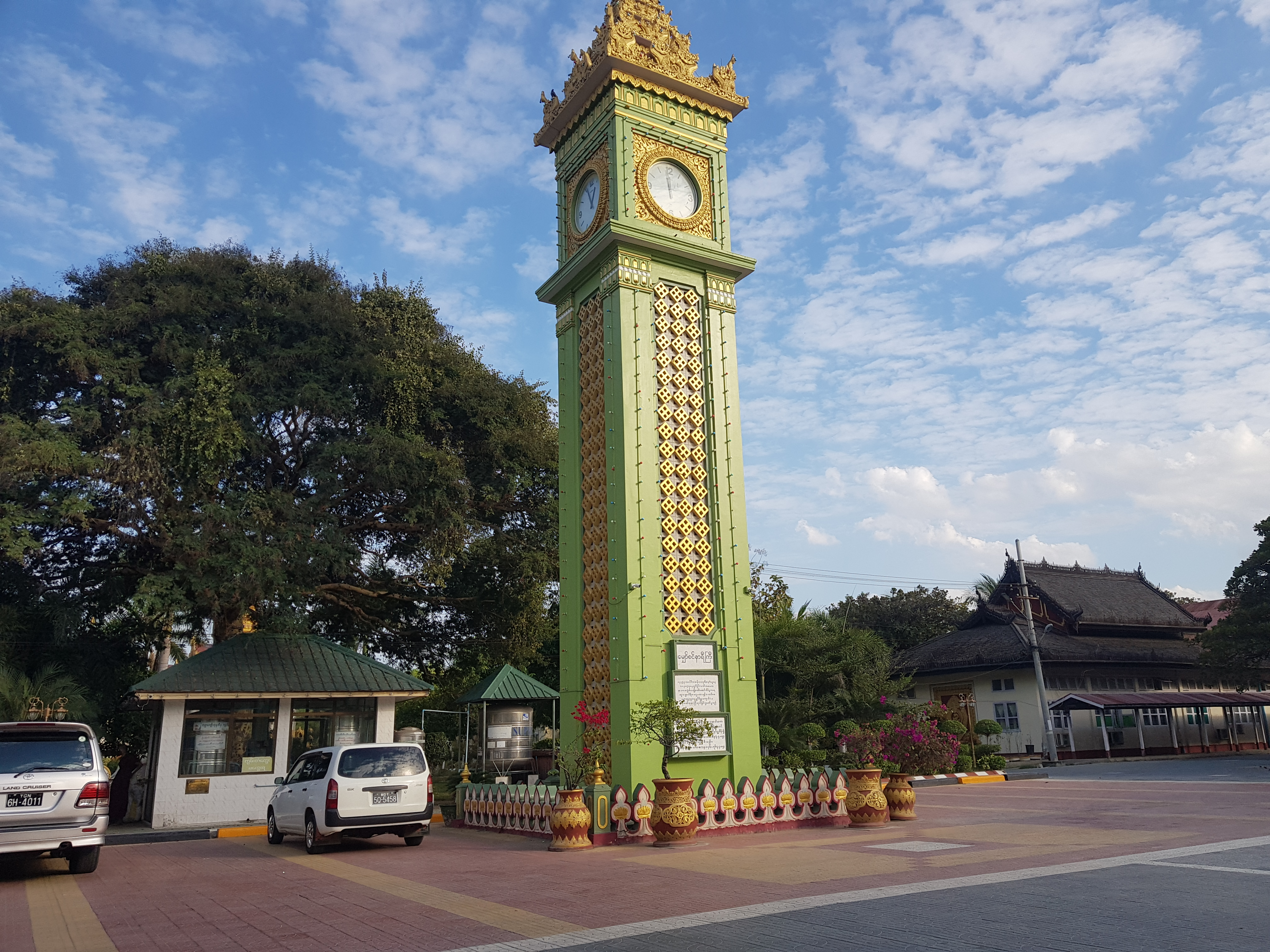
The Clock tower

== See also ==
- List of Buddhist universities across the world
