= David Komito =

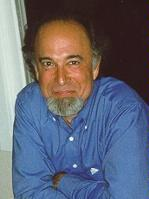
David Komito

David Ross Komito is a professor of Asian Philosophy and author on the subjects of Mādhyamaka Buddhist philosophy, meditation and the psychology of religion.

Komito received his B.A. in psychology from the University of California, Los Angeles, his M.A. in Religious Studies, M.S. in Counseling and Ph.D. in Tibetan Studies from Indiana University, Bloomington. From 1986 through 1990 he was Dean of John F. Kennedy University's Graduate School for the Study of Human Consciousness. Since 1987 has lectured at San Francisco Zen Center, Finding the Path to Liberation Buddhist Center and other Buddhist centers in the Western USA. After teaching at John F. Kennedy University and the University of San Francisco, he created the Religious Studies Program at Eastern Oregon University. Since retiring from Eastern Oregon University he has been teaching part-time in the Philosophy Department of Portland State University, Oregon.

He is married to the thangka artist Kayla Komito and lives in Santa Fe, New Mexico.

== Principal works ==
- 1983: "Tibetan Buddhism and Psychotherapy: a conversation with the Dalai Lama;" Journal of Transpersonal Psychology; 1983, Vol. 15, No. 1; p. 1-11.
- 1984: "Tibetan Buddhism and Psychotherapy: Further Conversations with the Dalai Lama;" Journal of Transpersonal Psychology; 1984, Vol. 16, No. 1; p. 1-24.
- 1987: Nagarjuna’s Seventy Stanzas: a Buddhist psychology of emptiness; translation and commentary on the Seventy stanzas on emptiness by Geshe Sonam Rinchen, Tenzin Dorjee, and David Ross Komito. Ithaca, NY: Snow Lion Publications ISBN 978-0-937938-39-3 (see 2001 for Dutch and French eds.)
- 1995: Paths and Grounds of Guhyasamaja According to Arya Nagarjuna; with commentary by Geshe Losang Tsephel; Yangchen Gawai Lodoe; translated by Tenzin Dorjee, co-translator on root text Jeremy Russell; edited by David Ross Komito and Andrew Fagan. Dharamsala: Library of Tibetan Works and Archives ISBN 81-85102-94-5
- 2001: Boeddhistische psychologie van de leegte: de zeventig stanza's van Nagarjuna; vertaling en commentaar door Geshe Sonam Rinchen, Tenzin Dorjee en David Ross Komito. Schoten: Kunchab Publikaties ISBN 978-90-74815-61-1 (see 1987 for original ed.)
- 2001: Nagarjuna: psychologie bouddhiste de la vacuité: les soixante-dix versets sur la vacuité; traduction et commentaire par Guéshé Sonam Rintchen, Tendzin Dordjé et David Ross Komito; traduit de l'américain par Catherine Saint-Guily. Schoten: Kunchab Publications ISBN 978-90-74815-50-5 (see 1987 for original ed.)
- 2003: Rehearsing Enlightenment: a retreat in the Buddhist Himalayas. VSF Publications ISBN 0-9747300-0-9
- 2013: Buddhist Psychology of Self Liberation. VSF Publications ISBN 0-9747300-0-9
