= Bangladesh Sanskrit and Pali Education Board =

Research institute in Bangladesh

- Formation: 1971
- Headquarters: Dhaka, Bangladesh
- Region served: Bangladesh
- Official language: Bengali

Bangladesh Sanskrit and Pali Education Board is an autonomous government board that is responsible for Pali and Sanskrit education in Bangladesh and is located in Kamalapur Dharmarajika Bauddha Vihara, Dhaka, Bangladesh.

== History ==
Bangladesh Sanskrit and Pali Education Board was founded in 1915 in Kolkata, West Bengal, as the Bengal Sanskrit Association. In 1947 after the partition of India, the Bengal Sanskrit Association was divided into three separate branches. Assam Sanskrit Sabha was formed for Assam, the East Pakistan Sanskrit Sabha was formed for East Bengal, and the Bengal Sanskrit Education Association was formed for West Bengal. The East Pakistan Sanskrit Sabha was renamed to Pakistan Sanskrit and Pali Education Board in 1962. After the Independence of Bangladesh in 1971 it was renamed to Bangladesh Sanskrit and Pali Education Board. Secretaries of board included notable figures like Govinda Chandra Dev and Suddhananda Mahathero. The board has approved 110 Sanskrit colleges, 88 Pali colleges, and 50 examination centres.

== Institutions ==
- Chittagong Pali College
