= Buddha's Light International Association =

Taiwanese Buddhist organization

The BLIA emblem.

The Buddha's Light International Association (Chinese: 國際佛光會; pinyin: Guójì fóguāng huì; Pe̍h-ōe-jī: kok-chè Hu̍t-kong ē), commonly known as BLIA, is a lay Buddhist organization. BLIA was established by Hsing Yun in 1992. The organization is associated with Fo Guang Shan, the largest Buddhist organization in Taiwan.

In 2003, BLIA was granted the NGO association status by the United Nations Economic and Social Council (ECOSOC) and Department of Public Information (DPI).

Wu Po-hsiung, former chairman of the Kuomintang, is an active member and served as the BLIA's second president.

The world headquarters is located on the Hsi Lai Temple grounds in Hacienda Heights, California.

== BLIA Website ==
- BLIA World Headquarters
- BLIA Taiwan
