= Chittagong Pali College =

Research institute in Bangladesh

- Formation: 1939
- Headquarters: Chittagong, Bangladesh
- Region served: Bangladesh
- Official language: Bengali

Chittagong Pali College is a historic state college that specializes in Buddhist and Pali language studies in Bangladesh and is located in Chittagong.

== History ==
Chittagong Pali College was established in 1939 by Aggamahapandit Dharmabangsha Mahathero. The next head of the college was Pandit Dipankar Srijnan Mahathero, who was in that position till his death. After his death the college was renamed it to Dipankar Pali college in recognition of his contribution to the development of the college. The school is under the Bangladesh Sanskrit and Pali Education Board and is managed by a private governing body which must be changed every five years to according to government regulation. The college does not charge tuition but is financed by government grants and private donations.

== See also ==
- List of Buddhist universities across the world
