= International Theravāda Buddhist Missionary University =

Higher education institute in Yangon Region, Myanmar

Coordinates: 16.8727°N 96.1486°E

- အပြည်ပြည်ဆိုင်ရာ ထေရဝါဒဗုဒ္ဓဘာသာ သာသနာပြု တက္ကသိုလ်
- Established: 8 December 1998; 27 years ago
- Affiliations: Ministry of Religious Affairs
- Rector: Ashin Chekinda
- Students: 287 (2013-2014)
- Location: Dhammapãla Hill, Mayangon Township, Yangon Region, Myanmar
- Nickname: ITBMU / Buddhist University
- Website: www.itbmu.org.mm

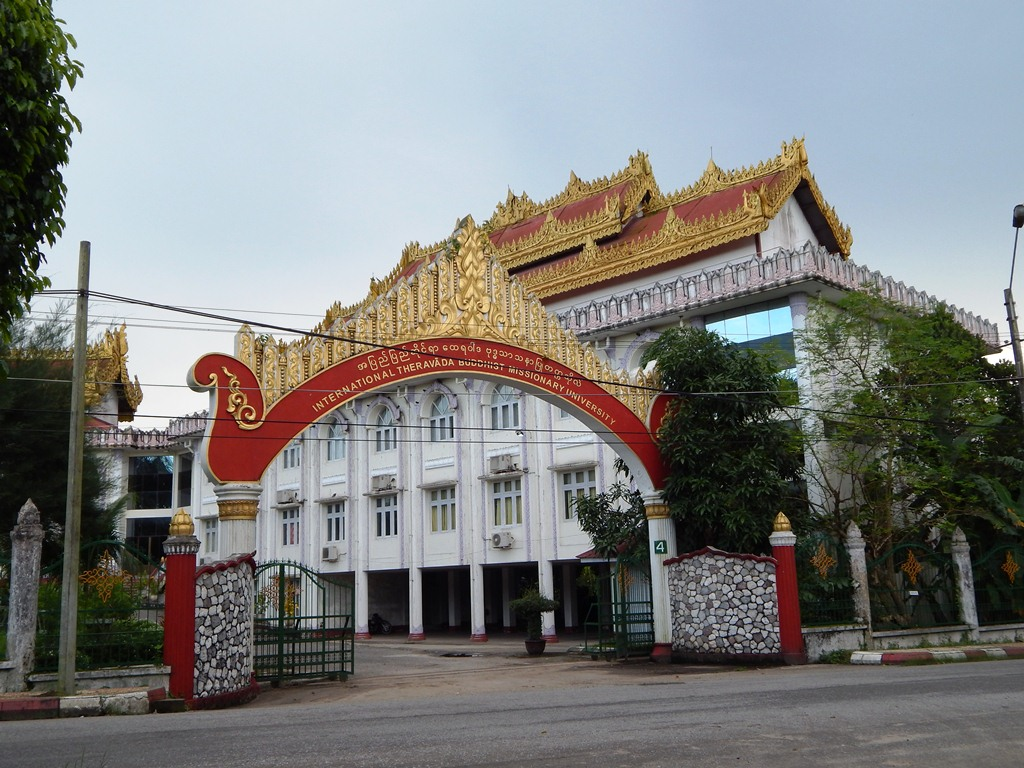
International Theravada Buddhist Missionary University campus

The International Theravāda Buddhist Missionary University (အပြည်ပြည်ဆိုင်ရာ ထေရဝါဒဗုဒ္ဓဘာသာ သာသနာပြု တက္ကသိုလ်) is a public university located on the Dhammapāla Hill, Mayangon Township, in Yangon, Myanmar. It was inaugurated on 6th waxing moon of Nadaw, 1360 ME (9 December 1998).

== Inauguration ==
The Minister for Religious Affairs, Major-General Sein Htwa, was the chairman of the International Theravada Buddhist Missionary University and responsible for the inauguration.

In September 1998, he welcomed Secretary-l Lt-Gen Khin Nyunt at the university site and briefed him on the preparations for opening the university. This included processing applications of trainees seeking admission, hiring faculty members and other staff, drawing up curricula, collecting textbooks and teacher's guides, constructing the buildings and preparing for the opening ceremony of the university.

The inauguration ceremony was held on 6th waxing moon of Nadaw, 1360 ME (9 December 1998), Wednesday, at the Mahã Pãsãna Cave on Kaba-Aye Hill, Mayangone, Yangon. In May 1999 at a meeting of the council Sein Htwa noted that the university was new and there had been some difficulties, but they had all been overcome.

== Objectives ==
The objectives are:

- to study and comprehend the canonical texts of Theravada Pitaka as approved successively by the Fifth and Sixth Buddhist Council held in Myanmar.
- to abstain from evil deeds and practice good deeds.
- to promote the four modes of sublime living (Brahma-vihara dhamma) which would lead to the establishment of peaceful and prosperous world and
- to train more missionaries endowed with good morality, to be well-versed in Pitaka literature to have experience in meditation practices.

"Not to do any Evil, to do all Good, To Purify one's mind, This is the teaching of the Buddha."

== Admonitions ==
The admonition of The great Benefactor Sayadaw Mingun Tipitakadhara Bhaddanta Vicittasãrãbhivamsa

- Never act, Speak or think of anything that may harm others.
- Don't use Harsh words. Keep your mind filled with loving-kindness.
- Think good thoughts, do what is right, speak the truth.
- Now is the opportune moment. Use it well until you realise Nibbãna.

== Rectors ==
The late Dr. Bhaddanta Silanandabhivamsa (16 December 1927) was the first rector in International Theravada Buddhist Missionary University. He was regarded as an extraordinarily skilful meditation teacher and well-known scholar. He taught Vipassana meditation, Abhidhamma and other aspects of Theravada Buddhism in English, Myanmar, Pali and Sanskrit. Myanmar government awarded the Doctorate of Literature (2000), Aggamahasaddhammajotikadvaja (1999) and Aggamahapandita (1993) titles. He died on 13 August 2005 in California, USA.

Dr. Bhaddanta Nandamalabhivamsa was the second rector. He was born on 22 March 1940. He was educated at Vipassana Ghandarama Monastery, Maha visuddharama Taik Thit in Mandalay. He passed the religious examinations with distinctions. He got Dhammacariya at the young age of sixteen. Because of his brilliant performance in scriptural studies, he continued to get prestigious titles such as Abhivamsa Cetayangana Pariyatti Dhammacariya Gantavacaka, Abhivamsa Priyatti Sasanahita Dhammacariya and Vinaya Pali Paragu. He got his M.A. from Kelaniya University of Colombo, Sri Lanka, and he received his doctorate from Magadha University in India. He is also the Rector of Sitagu International Buddhist Academy in Sagaing. Because of his experience in scriptural teaching, the government conferred upon him the religious title Aggamaha Gantavacaka Pandita in 1996 and Aggamaha Pandita in 1999.

The present rector, Ashin Chekinda was appointed in 2022.

== Faculties ==
At the ITBMU, there are four faculties comprising the following departments.

=== Faculty of Pariyatti ===
- Department of Vinaya Studies
- Department of Suttanta Studies
- Department of Abhidhamma Studies

=== Faculty of Patipatti ===
- Department of Vipassana Studies
- Department of Samatha Studies
- Department of Dhammãnuloma Studies

=== Faculty of Religions and Missionary Works ===
- Department of Comparative Studies of Religions
- Department of Research
- Department of Missionary Works
- Department of Buddhist Culture and History

=== Faculty of Foreign Language and Translation ===
- Department of Chinese
- Department of English
- Department of French
- Department of German
- Department of Japanese
- Department of Myanmar Language
- Department of Pali Language

== Library ==
The ITBMU Library has 25,670 books including Pali Text Society's Series, the International Encyclopaedia on Buddhism of 75 volumes, Encyclopedia of Religions and Ethics and latest Buddhist scriptures written by famous Theravada Buddhist monks.

=== Other libraries ===
The academic staff and the students have easy access to the Library of the Ministry of Religious Affairs. It is situated in the precinct of Kaba Aye Pagoda close to the International Theravada Buddhist Missionary University campus. The Library holds 45,233 volumes and 12,265 palm leaf manuscripts. Steps are being taken to upgrade the library facilities.

== Programmes ==
One-year diploma and other degree are offered for graduate and post-graduate students. They are as follows:

- One-year diploma course: Diploma in Buddha Dhamma in (B.Dh.)
- Two-years graduate degree course: Bachelor of Arts in Buddha Dhamma: B.A. (B.Dh.)
- Three-years M.A post graduate course: Master of Arts in Buddha Dhamma: M.A. (B.Dh)
- Four-years Ph.D. post graduate course: Doctor of Philosophy in Buddha Dhamma: Ph.D. (B.Dh.)

A one-year diploma course in Buddha Dhamma was introduced in December 1998. Then, diploma conferring ceremonies were successively held for seven years. Diploma certificates have been presented to 192 foreign and local students. The first convocation for B.A. (Buddha Dhamma) degree was held in June 2002. B.A (B.Dh) degree was conferred presented to 192 foreign and local students. M.A. (B.Dh) course was started in 2003.

== Academic semester ==
The first semester starts in June and ends in September. The second semester starts in December and ends in March.

=== Vacation ===
April and May in the first semester; in the second semester November and December.

== Academic requirements ==
Anyone regardless of gender, race, religion, and creed, having education qualifications prescribed by the university, can apply for admission. However, students are required to sit for the entrance examination. The entrance test is held the second week of January ( around 9–11 January).

Any applicant for diploma in Buddha Dhamma will have to meet the following requirements:

- Foreign monks, nuns and laymen must have passed at least the matriculation or equivalent.
- Laymen and nuns who are Myanmar citizens must have their first degrees B.A. or B.Sc. Myanmar monks must have passed Dhammacāriya examination. They must be below 45 years old.
- All candidates need to sit for an entrance examination prescribed by the university.
- They should have some knowledge of Theravada Buddhist scriptures. They must be fluent or conversant in spoken and written English.

=== Materials ===
- Entrance exam questions
- Entrance exam questions
- Entrance Test Guide
- ITBMU Catalog
- ITBMU Entrance Test Application Form

=== Getting Visa ===
The student should go to the embassy where he/she sat for the exam to get a religious visa, not tourist visa. With this religious visa, then the student can come to ITBMU few days before the first semester begins.

Once an international student is admitted to the diploma course, the Ministry of Religious Affairs will take care of one year visa application and its extension. The visa will be extended yearly.

=== Other expenses ===
Tuition, boarding and messing for foreign students will be provided free by the university. Travel expenses for joining will not be borne by the university.

== See also ==
- List of Buddhist universities across the world
