= Lumbini Buddhist University =

University in Napal

- लुम्बिनी बौद्ध विश्वविद्यालय
- Other name: LBU
- Motto: Buddhist religion, philosophy, literature and culture.
- Type: Public university
- Established: 17 June 2004; 22 years ago
- Budget: Rs. 495.9 million (USD $3.33 million) (2025–26)
- Chancellor: Prime Minister of Nepal
- Vice-Chancellor: Vacant
- Academic staff: 218 (~178 teaching staff 40 administrative and support personnel)
- Students: 2050
- Location: Lumbini Sanskritik, Lumbini, Nepal; 27.49°N 83.28°E
- Campus: 382.44 acres (154.77 ha); Midsize city
- Website: lbu.edu.np

Lumbini Buddhist University (Nepali: लुम्बिनी बौद्ध विश्वविद्यालय) is a tertiary educational institution in Lumbini, Nepal, the birthplace of the Buddha. The idea for the university was conceived at the First World Buddhist Summit held in Lumbini in 1998, and it was officially formed on 17 June 2004. The Lumbini Buddhist University Act promulgated on 10 November 2006 confirmed its legal status as well as setting out that the university would receive financial assistance from the government of Nepal.

It will offer a four years course for a Bachelor in Buddhism, as well as MA and PhD courses.

== Organisation ==
- Chancellor: Prime Minister of Nepal
- Pro-Chancellor: Minister of Education
- Vice-Chancellor: Prof. Subarna Lal Bajracharya
- Registrar: Tilak Ram Acharya
- Dean, Faculty of Buddhist Studies: Manik Ratna Shakya
- Dean, Faculty of Humanities & Social Sciences : Hari Sharan Chakhun

== Affiliated colleges ==
- City Campus Butwal
- Central Campus
- School of Development Studies and Applied Sciences
- Buddha Multiple Campus
- Jiri Buddhist College
- Lotus Buddhist Academic College, Lalitpur
- Lumbini International Academy of Science and Technology
- Lumbini Academic College of Buddhism and Himalayan Studies
- Sowa Rigpa International College
- Sugat Baudha Mahavidyalaya
- Theravada Buddhist Academy
- Tulsipur Metro College (Local Level Government: Tulsipur Metropolis)
- Aksheswar Traditional Buddhist Art College
- Thrangu Sekhar College of Mediation
- Sulakshyan Kriti Campus

== See also ==
- Lumbini Development Trust, Nepal
