= Vimal =

Vimal may refer to:

== People ==
- Vimal (name), an Indian male given name
  - Vimal (actor) (born 1979), an Indian actor in Tamil films

== Education ==
- Vimal Jyothi Engineering College, Kerala, India
- Vimal Jyothi Institute of Management and Research, Chemperi, Kerala, India

== See also ==
- Vimala (disambiguation), feminine form of the name
- Bimal (name), alternative spelling of the name
- Wimal, Sinhala version of the name
