= Buddhism in Myanmar =

ထေရဝါဒဗုဒ္ဓသာသနာ Theravāda Buddha Sāsana
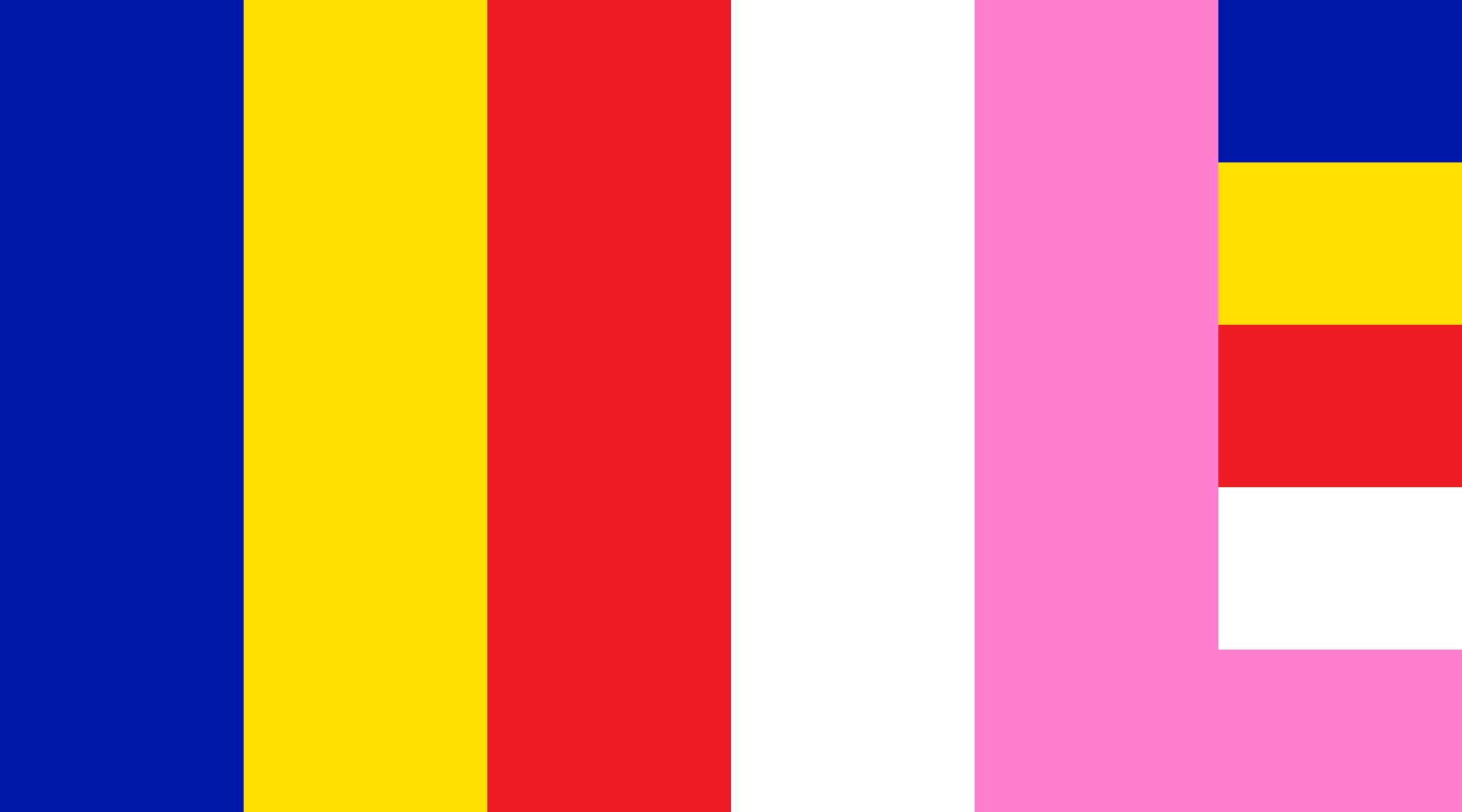
- သာသနာ့အလံတော် Flag of the Buddha Sāsana

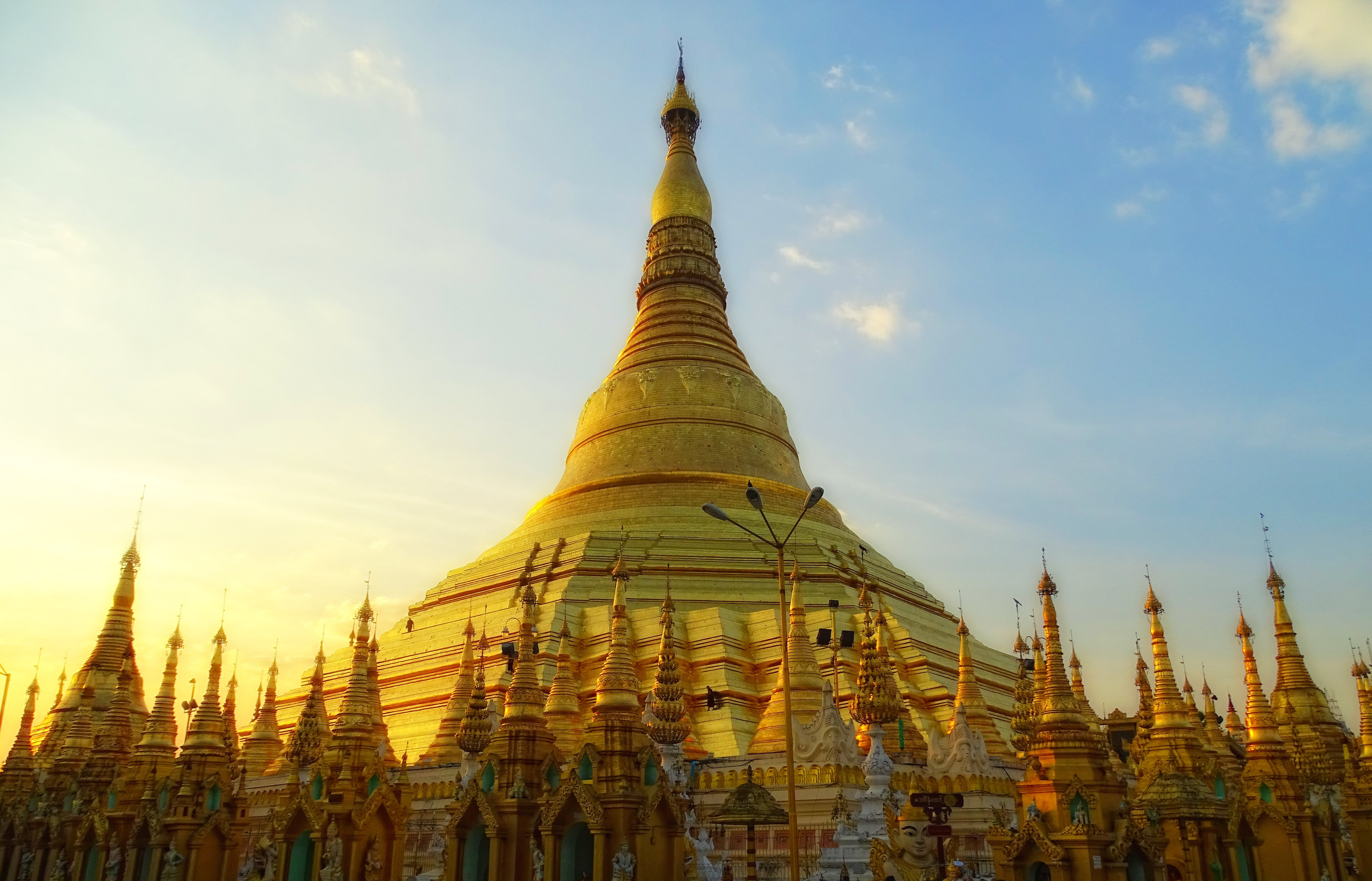
- The famous Shwedagon Pagoda in Yangon, Myanmar

Total population
- c. 48 million (90%)

Regions with significant populations
- Throughout Myanmar

Religions
- Theravāda Buddhism

Languages
- Burmese and other languages

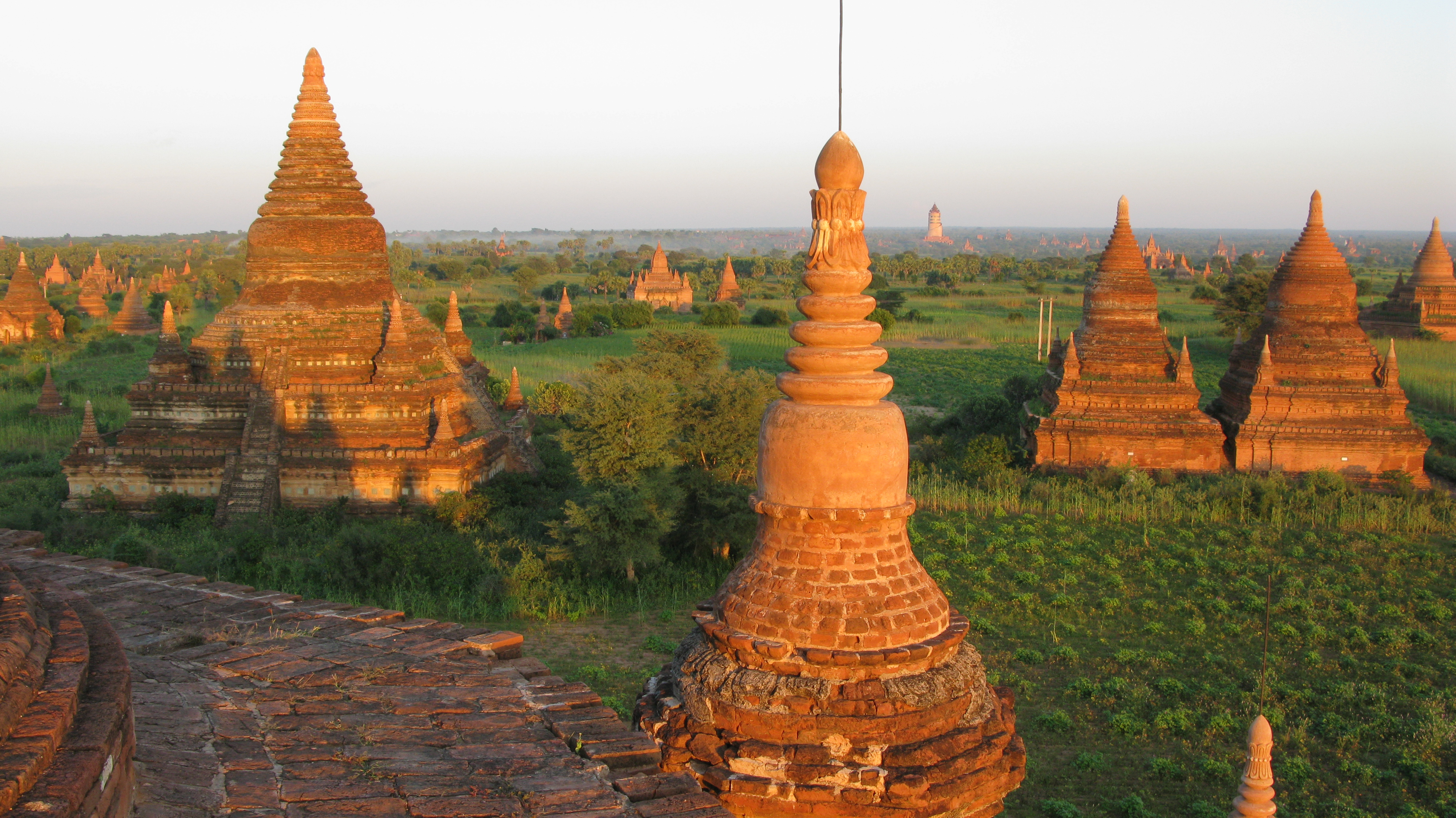
Temples in the ancient city of Bagan

Buddhism (Burmese: ဗုဒ္ဓဘာသာ), specifically Theravada branch (Burmese: ထေရဝါဒဗုဒ္ဓဘာသာ), is the largest religion in Myanmar, and practiced by approximately 88% of the population. It is the most religious Buddhist country in terms of the proportion of monks in the population and proportion of income spent on religion. With approximately 48 million Buddhists, Myanmar has the third largest Buddhist population in the world, after Thailand and China. Adherents are most likely found among the Bamar, Shan, Rakhine, Mon, Karen, and Chinese who are well integrated into Burmese society. Monks, collectively known as the sangha (community), are venerated members of Burmese society. Among many ethnic groups in Myanmar, including the Bamar and Shan, Theravada Buddhism is practiced in conjunction with the worship of nats, which are spirits who can intercede in worldly affairs. Buddhists in Myanmar are governed by Burmese customary law.

Two popular practices are merit-making and vipassanā meditation. There is also the less popular weizza path. Merit-making is the most common path undertaken by Burmese Buddhists. This path involves the observance of the Five precepts and accumulation of good merit through charity (dana, often to monks) and good deeds to obtain a favorable rebirth. The meditation path, which has gained ground since the early 20th century, is a form of Buddhist meditation which is seen as leading to awakening and can involve intense meditation retreats. The weizza path is an esoteric system of occult practices (such as recitation of spells, samatha and alchemy) believed to lead to life as a weizza (Burmese: ဝိဇ္ဇာ Pali: vijjā), a semi-immortal and supernatural being who awaits the appearance of the future Buddha, Maitreya (Burmese: အရိမေ‌တ္တေယျ Pali: Arimetteyya).

== Pre-modern history ==
=== Buddhism in the Mon and Pyu states ===
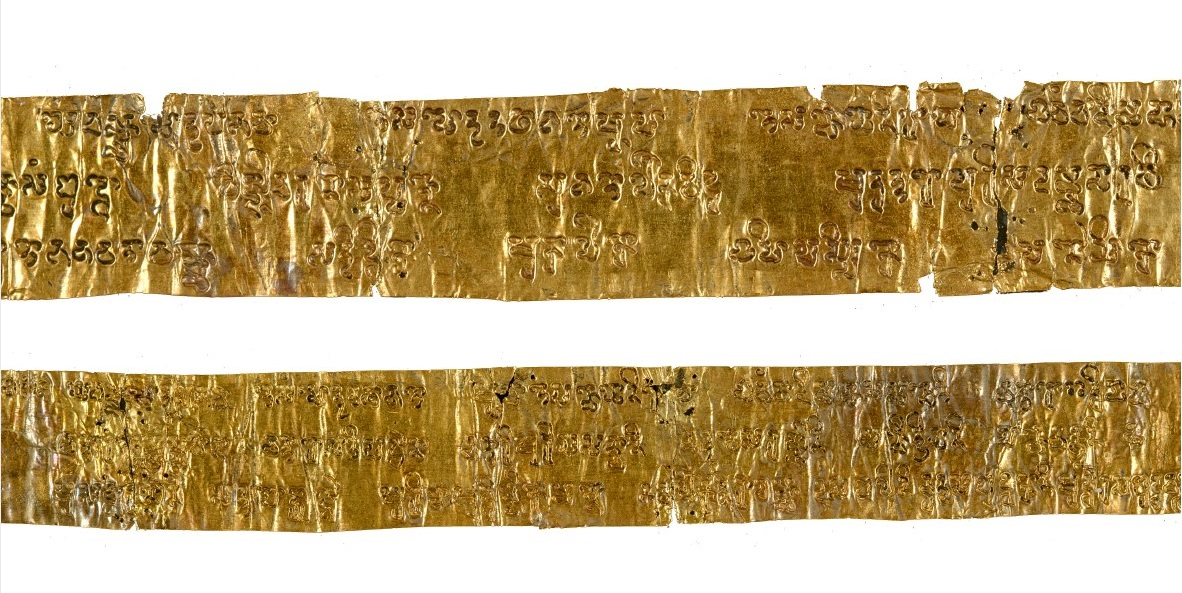
Gold plates containing fragments of the Pali Tipitaka (5th century) found in Maunggan (a village near the city of Sriksetra)

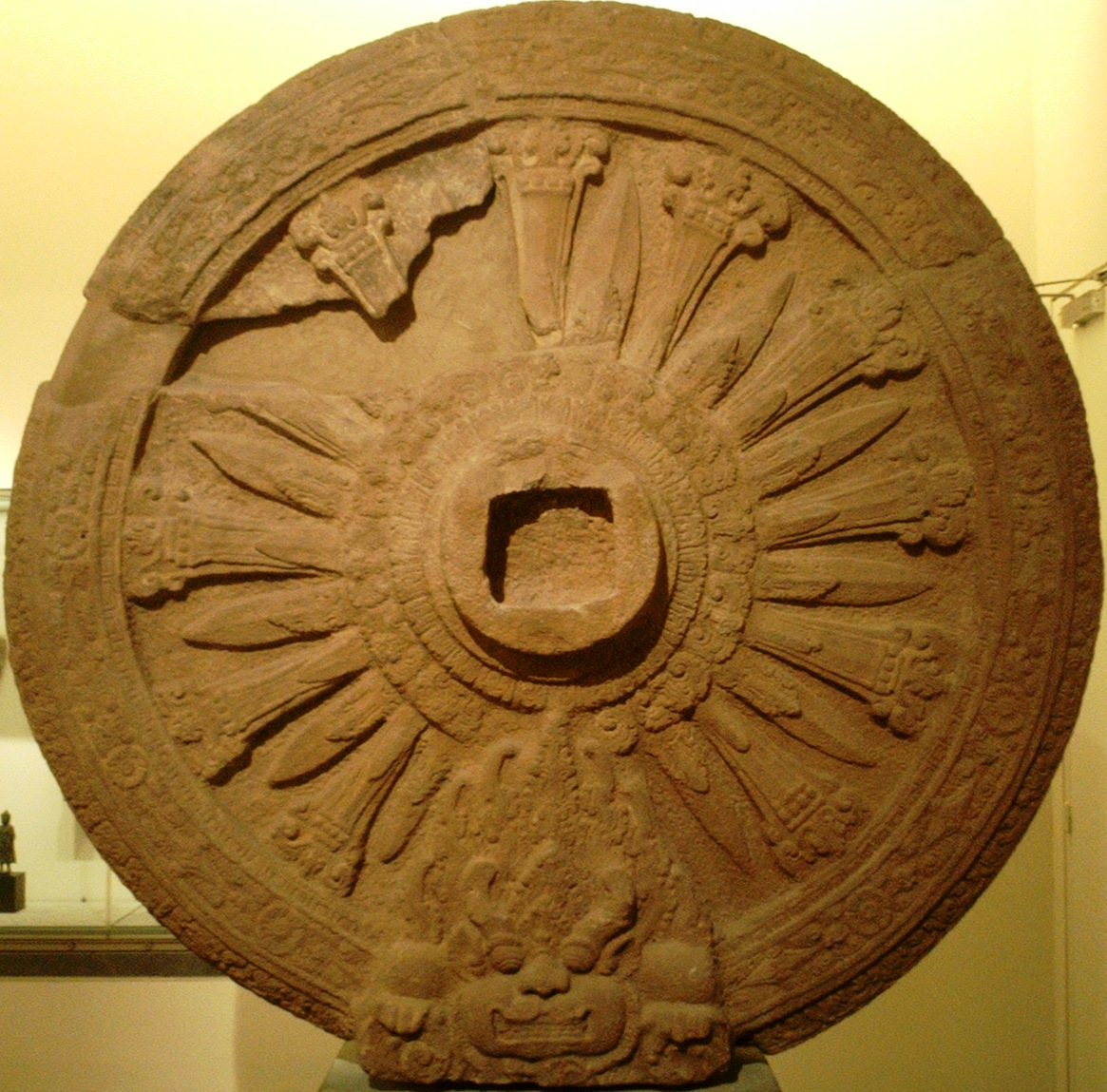
A Dharma wheel from the Mon Dvaravati state

The early history of Buddhism in Burma is hard to decipher. Pali historical chronicles state that Ashoka sent two bhikkhus, Sona and Uttara, to Suvaṇṇabhūmi ("The Golden Land") around 228 BCE with other monks and sacred texts as part of his effort to spread Buddhism. The area has been recognized as being somewhere in ancient Southeast Asia, possibly in Thaton in Lower Burma or Nakon Pathom in Thailand.

An Andhra Ikshvaku inscription from about the 3rd century CE refers to the conversion of the Kiratas (Cilatas) to Buddhism. These may have been the Mon-Khmer speaking peoples of ancient Arakan and Lower Burma (i.e. the Pyu states and Mon kingdoms). 3rd century Chinese texts speak of a "Kingdom of Liu-Yang," where people worshiped the Buddha, and there were "several thousand sramanas". This kingdom has been located in central Burma.

By the 4th century, most of Pyu had become predominantly Buddhist, though archaeological finds prove that their pre-Buddhist practices also remained firmly entrenched in the following centuries. According to the excavated texts, as well as the Chinese records, the predominant religion of the Pyu was Theravāda Buddhism.

Peter Skilling concludes that there is firm epigraphical evidence for the dominant presence of Theravāda in the Pyu Kingdom of Sriksetra and the Mon kingdom of Dvaravati, "from about the 5th century CE onwards", though he adds that evidence shows that Mahāyāna was also present. The epigraphical evidence comes from Pali inscriptions which have been found in these areas. They use a variant of the South Indian Pallava script.

The oldest surviving Buddhist texts in the Pāli language come from Pyu city-state of Sri Ksetra. The text, which is dated from the mid 5th to mid 6th century, is written on solid gold plaques. The similarity of the script used in these plates with that of the Andhra-Kuntala-Pallava region indicates that Theravada in Burma first arrived from this part of South India.

According to Skilling the Pyu and Mon realms "were flourishing centres of Buddhist culture in their own right, on an equal footing with contemporary centres like Anuradhapura." These Mon-Pyu Buddhist traditions were the predominant form of Buddhism in Burma until the late 12th century when Shin Uttarajiva led the reform which imported the Sri Lankan Mahavihara school to Burma.

From the 8th to the 12th centuries Indian Buddhist traditions increasingly spread to Southeast Asia via the Bay of Bengal trade network. Because of this, before the 12th century, the areas of Thailand, Myanmar, Laos, and Cambodia were influenced by the Buddhist traditions of India, some of which included the teachings of Mahāyāna Buddhism and the use of the Sanskrit language. In the 7th century, Yijing noted in his travels that in Southeast Asia, all major sects of Indian Buddhism flourished.

Archaeological finds have also established the presence of Vajrayana, Mahayana and Hinduism in Burma. In Sri Ksetra, Pegu and other regions of ancient Burma, Brahmanical Hinduism was also a strong rival to Buddhism and was often in competition with it. This is attested in the Burmese historical chronicles. Prominent Mahayana figures such as Avalokiteśvara, Tara, Vaiśravaṇa, and Hayagriva, were included in Pyu (and later Bagan) iconography. Brahmanical deities such as Brahma, Vishnu, Shiva, Garuda and Lakshmi have been found, especially in Lower Burma.

=== Buddhism in the Bagan Kingdom ===
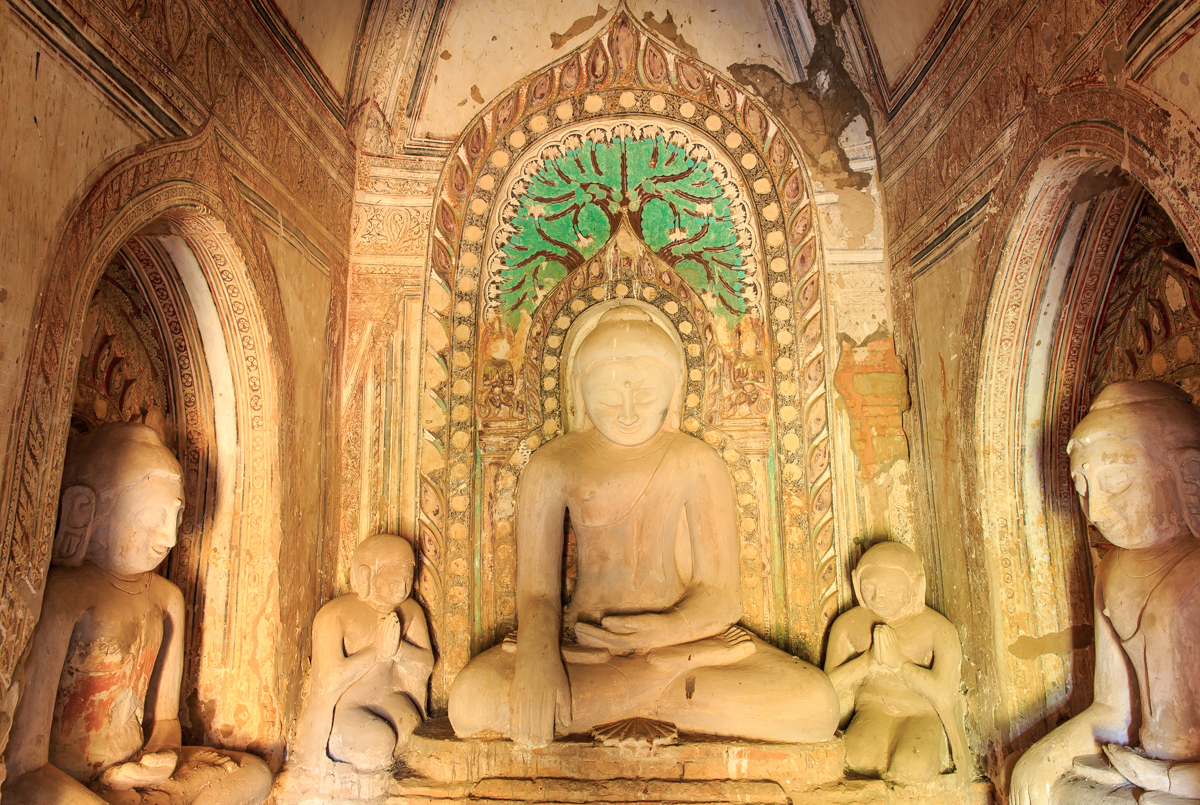
Buddha statues in one of the monastic cells in the Somingyi Kyaung temple, located just south of Nagayon in Bagan

The Myanma people (Burmans) also adopted Buddhism as they came into contact with the Pyu and Mon civilizations. Initially, Burmese Buddhism was dominated by an eclectic Buddhism called Ari Buddhism, which included Mahayana and Vajrayana elements as well animist practices like nat worship and influences from Brahmanism.

The Bamar adoption of Buddhism accelerated in the 11th century during the reign of king Anawrahta (Pali: Aniruddha, 1044–1077) who transformed the Bagan Kingdom into a major power in the region through the conquest of the Irrawaddy river valley, which included the Mon city of Thaton. During his reign, Mon Buddhist culture, architecture and writing came to be largely assimilated into the Bamar culture.

Though later historical chronicles (like the Sāsanavaṃsa) state that Anawrahta conquered Thaton in order to obtain the Buddhist scriptures and that a "pure Theravada Buddhism" was established during his reign, it is likely that Theravada was known in Bagan before the 11th century. Furthermore, Bagan Theravāda was never truly "pure" as it included local animist rites, Naga worship and Brahmanical rites associated with Vishnu officiated by Brahmin priests.

Anawrahta implemented a series of religious reforms throughout his kingdom, attempting to weaken the power of the Tantric Mahayana Ari monks (also called "Samanakuttakas") and their unorthodox ways. Burmese historical chronicles state that Anawrahta was converted by a Mon bhikkhu, Shin Arahan, to Theravāda Buddhism. The king may have been worried about the influence of the forest dwelling Ari Buddhist monks and sought a way to subvert their power. The Ari monks, who ate evening meals, drank liquor, and presided over animal sacrifices and sexual rites, were considered heretical by the more orthodox Theravāda circles of monks like Shin Arahan.

Anawrahta banished many Ari priests who refused to conform and many of them fled to Popa Hill and the Shan Hills. Anawrahta also invited Theravāda scholars from the Mon lands, Sri Lanka and India to Bagan. Their scholarship helped revitalize a more orthodox form of Theravāda Buddhism, with a focus on Pali learning and Abhidhamma philosophy. Anawrahta is also known as a great temple builder. Some of his main achievements include the Shwezigon Pagoda and the Shwesandaw Pagoda.

However, Anawrahta did not attempt to remove all non-Theravāda elements from his kingdom. Indeed, Anawrahta continued to support some Mahayana practices. He allowed and even promoted the worship of the traditional Burmese nat spirits and allowed their worship in Buddhist temples and pagodas, presumably as a way to attract and appease the population and gradually have them accept the new Buddhist religion.

Therefore, the spread and dominance of Theravāda in Burma was a gradual process, taking centuries and was really completed only in the 19th century. Hinduism, Ari Buddhism and nat worship remained influential forces in Burma at least until the 13th century, though the royal court generally favored Theravada. The Ari practices included the worship of Mahayana figures like Avalokiteśvara (Lawka nat), Tara and Manjushri. The worship of Brahmanical deities, especially Narayana, Vishnu, Ganesha and Brahma, as well as the nats, also remained popular. These gods were worshiped in their own temples (such as Vaisnava Nathlaung Kyaung) as well as at Buddhist temples.

Burmese Theravada did not ignore these practices and, in some cases, incorporated them into the Theravada pantheon. Thus, the worship of Lokanatha was accepted in Burmese Theravada as well as the worship of a list of 37 Nats that were royally sanctioned. The influence of these various religions is still felt in folk Burmese Buddhism today, which contains several elements of nat worship, esotericism, Mahayana and Hinduism. The Weikza tradition is particularly influenced by these unorthodox elements.

It seems that Bagan Theravāda was mainly supported by elite city dwellers, with over 90 percent of religious gifts being given by royalty, aristocrats, military officers and temple artisans. Meanwhile, the peasants in the countryside tended to be more associated with the animistic nat based religion.

At its height, the Bagan Kingdom became an important center of Theravāda scholarship. According to Lieberman:

At the great capital itself and some provincial centers, Buddhist temples supported an increasingly sophisticated Pali scholarship, part of an international tradition, which specialized in grammar and philosophical-psychological (abhidhamma) studies and which reportedly won the admiration of Sinhalese experts. Besides religious texts, Pagan’s monks read works in a variety of languages on prosody, phonology, grammar, astrology, alchemy, and medicine, and developed an independent school of legal studies. Most students, and probably the leading monks and nuns, came from aristocratic families.

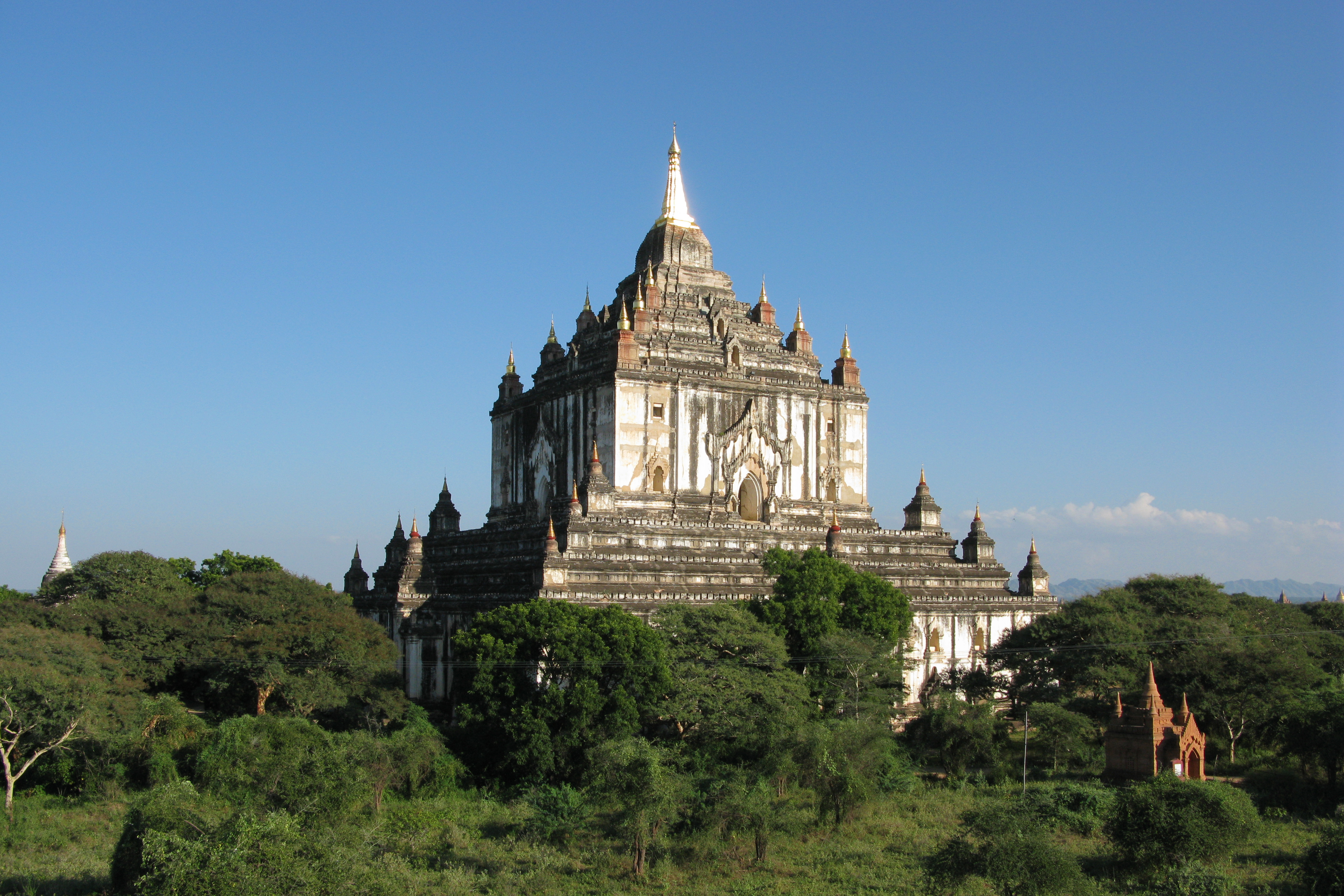
Thatbyinnyu Temple, 12th century, Bagan

The Burmese chronicles give a long list of monastic scholars (and their works) who worked during this era. Some important scholars of the Bagan era were Acariya Dhammasenapati, Aggavamsa Thera, Capata (Saddhammajotipala), Saddhammasiri, Vimalabuddhi, Aggapandita and Dhammadassi. Their work focused on the intricacies of Pali grammar as well as on Theravada Abhidhamma.

Another key figure of Bagan Buddhism was the Mon Buddhist monk Shin Uttarajīva. He was a leading religious leader during the reigns of Narathu (1167–1171), Naratheinkha (1171–74) and Narapatisithu (1167–1191). Uttarajiva presided over the realignment of Burmese Buddhism with the Mahavihara school of Sri Lanka, moving away from the Conjeveram-Thaton school of Shin Arahan. Even though the kings supported the reform and sent numerous monks to Sri Lanka to re-ordain, various Burmese monks of the old order (known as the Maramma Sangha) refused to ordain in the new Burmese Sri Lankan based order (the Sinhala Sangha), and this led to a schism. The schism lasted two centuries before the old order finally died out.

Later kings continued to support Theravada Buddhism and its mainly Mon scholarly elite. In the 13th century, the Bamar kings and elites built countless Buddhist stupas and temples, especially around the capital city of Bagan. These acts of generosity were a way to gain merit (puñña) and to show that one had phun (glory, spiritual power). Bagan kings presented themselves as bodhisattvas, who saw themselves as responsible for the spiritual merit of their subjects. They also saw themselves as Dharma kings (Dhammaraja) who were protectors and promoters of the Buddhist religion. Bagan kings also promoted themselves as manifestations of the god Sakka.

The scale of state donations to Buddhist temples grew throughout the 13th century and many of these temples were also given arable land grants which were tax exempt as well as slaves. Over time, this flow of wealth and agricultural capacity to the Buddhist temples put increasing economic strain on the kingdom.

To recover some of this wealth in an acceptable manner, kings often saw fit to "purify" or reform the Buddhist sangha (monastic community). However, in the 13th century, no Burmese kings were strong enough to manage and reform the increasingly rich and powerful sangha. The situation was also compounded by drier weather during the late 13th century and the 14th century (the Medieval Warm period), which lowered crop yields. Because of this, the state was weak and divided. It was unable to resist the invasion of new enemies like the Mongols, Hanthawaddy and the Shans.

The invasions by neighboring Shan and Mon states as well as the Mongol invasions of Burma (13th century) brought the Bagan Empire to its end (the capital fell in 1287).

=== Era of Fragmentation (14th–16th centuries) ===
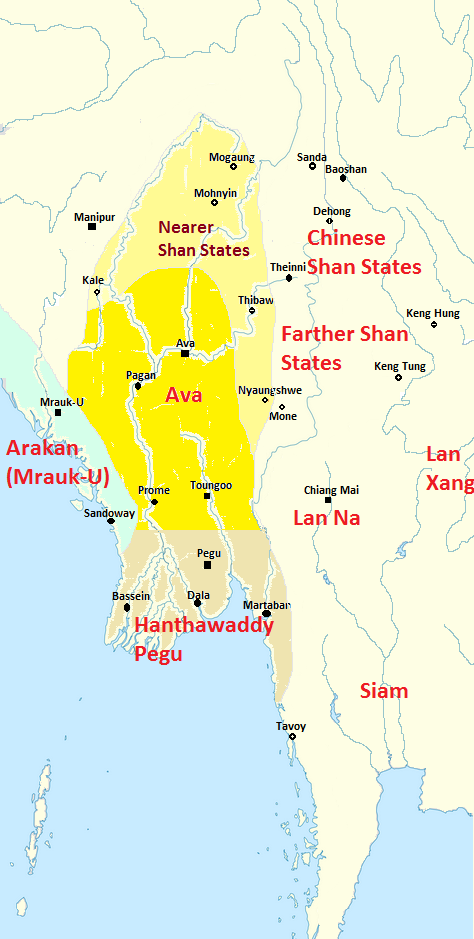
Burma in the 1450s showing the four major regional powers

This era saw the rise of various fragmented warring kingdoms (Burmese, Shan and Mon) all vying for power.

During this period, the western mainland remained divided between four main regional political-ethnic zones. In the Shan Realm, the Shan people established a loose confederation of valley kingdoms. The Shan kingdoms supported Theravada Buddhism in imitation of the Burmese elites, though the Buddhist institutions in the Shan realm never wielded political power as they did in the Burmese regions. In the 14th century, the Buddhist sangha continued to receive patronage from regional Shan kings like Thihathu and scholarly activities continued under their reigns. Meanwhile, Arakan was ruled by the kingdom of Mrauk-u, who also patronized Theravada Buddhism.

The main power in the Upper Burma region was the Kingdom of Ava (founded in 1365), which was still the most populous region in the western mainland, despite all the sociopolitical disorder of the era. However, this kingdom was severely weakened economically (lacking coastal trade access), and continued to suffer from the Pagan era issue of tax free religious estates. The leaders of Buddhist institutions grew in power during this era, assuming administrative and even military offices. While most Ava kings supported the sangha, one infamous ruler, Thohanbwa is known as a king who pillaged and destroyed many monasteries and temples and massacred numerous monks.

In spite of the political weakness of the kingdom, Buddhist scholarship flourished during this time, with prominent scholars like Ariyavamsa, Silavamsa and Ratthasara composing numerous works. Ariyavamsa is known for his Manisaramañjusa, a sub-commentary on the Abhidhammatthavibhavani, and his Manidipa, a commentary on the Atthasalini. He also wrote some works in Burmese, and thus was one of the first pioneers to write Buddhist works in that language.

In Lower Burma the Mon people were dominant. The most powerful of the Mon kingdoms was Hanthawaddy (a.k.a. Ramaññadesa), founded by Wareru. He was a patron of Theravada Buddhism, and also led the compilation of the Wareru Dhammasattha, an influential code of law patterned on Bagan customary law and influenced by Buddhism.

In spite of their support for Theravada Buddhism, many of the people in Burma during this era continued to practice animist and other non-Buddhist religious rites. Shan, Burmese and Mon elites often practiced animal sacrifice and worshiped nat spirits during this period. Meanwhile, the forest dwelling Ari monks continued to practice rites in which alcohol was imbibed and animals were sacrificed. However, there were also more orthodox Buddhist movements and tendencies in this era, such as a teetotal movement which was influential from the 14th century onwards, as can be seen from surviving inscriptions of the era. By the 16th and 17th centuries, this movement seemed to have been successful in replacing the drinking of alcohol in public ceremonies with pickled tea.

The royalty also often promoted orthodoxy and Buddhist reform. The greatest of the Hanthawaddy kings, Dhammazedi (Dhammaceti), was a former Mon bhikkhu who ruled from 1471 to 1492. According to the Kalyani Inscriptions, Dhammazedi carried out an extensive reform of the Buddhist sangha by sending thousands of Buddhist monks to Sri Lanka to receive ordination and training in the Mahavihara tradition. He also purified the sangha of undisciplined monks, such as monks who owned land or other forms of material wealth.

The invitation of Sinhalese monks and ordination lineages as a way to reform the sangha was also adopted in Mrauk-U, Ava, Toungoo, and Prome. These Sinhalese Theravada lineages spread throughout the mainland through the different trade routes, reaching the Shan realm, Thailand and Laos. They brought with them Theravada texts, rituals, lowland alphabets and calendars. These changes paved the way for the standardizing Theravada reforms of the first Taungoo dynasty in the mid-16th century.

=== Taungoo Buddhism (1510–1752) ===
In the 16th century, the Burmese Taungoo dynasty unified all of Burma under energetic leaders like Tabinshwehti (r.1531–1550) and Bayinnaung (r.1551–1581). Taungoo exploited the higher population of upper Burma along with European style firearms to create the largest empire in Southeast Asia.

Taungoo monarchs patronised the Mahavihara Theravada tradition (the Sinhala Sangha). During the First Toungoo Empire, a reform movement led by the Taungoo kings took place, which attempted to standardize the Buddhism of Upper Burma and the Shan region in line with the Mahavihara tradition. These reforms were modeled after those of Dhammazedi.

Before the reform, the Buddhism of the Shan realm and Upper Burma was still heavily influenced by animism, Ari Buddhism and pre-Buddhist ritualism (which included animal and human sacrifice). Even in Lower Burma, where Theravada was more dominant, nat worship and Ari Buddhist practices also remained influential.

Phukhao Thong just outside Ayutthaya, donated by Bayinnaung

Bayinnaung attempted to bring the religious practice of his empire more in line with the orthodox Sri Lankan Mahavihara tradition (i.e. the Sinhala Sangha). Bayinnaung distributed copies of the Pali scriptures, promoted scholarship and built pagodas throughout his empire. One of the main temples built in his reign was the Mahazedi Pagoda at Pegu.

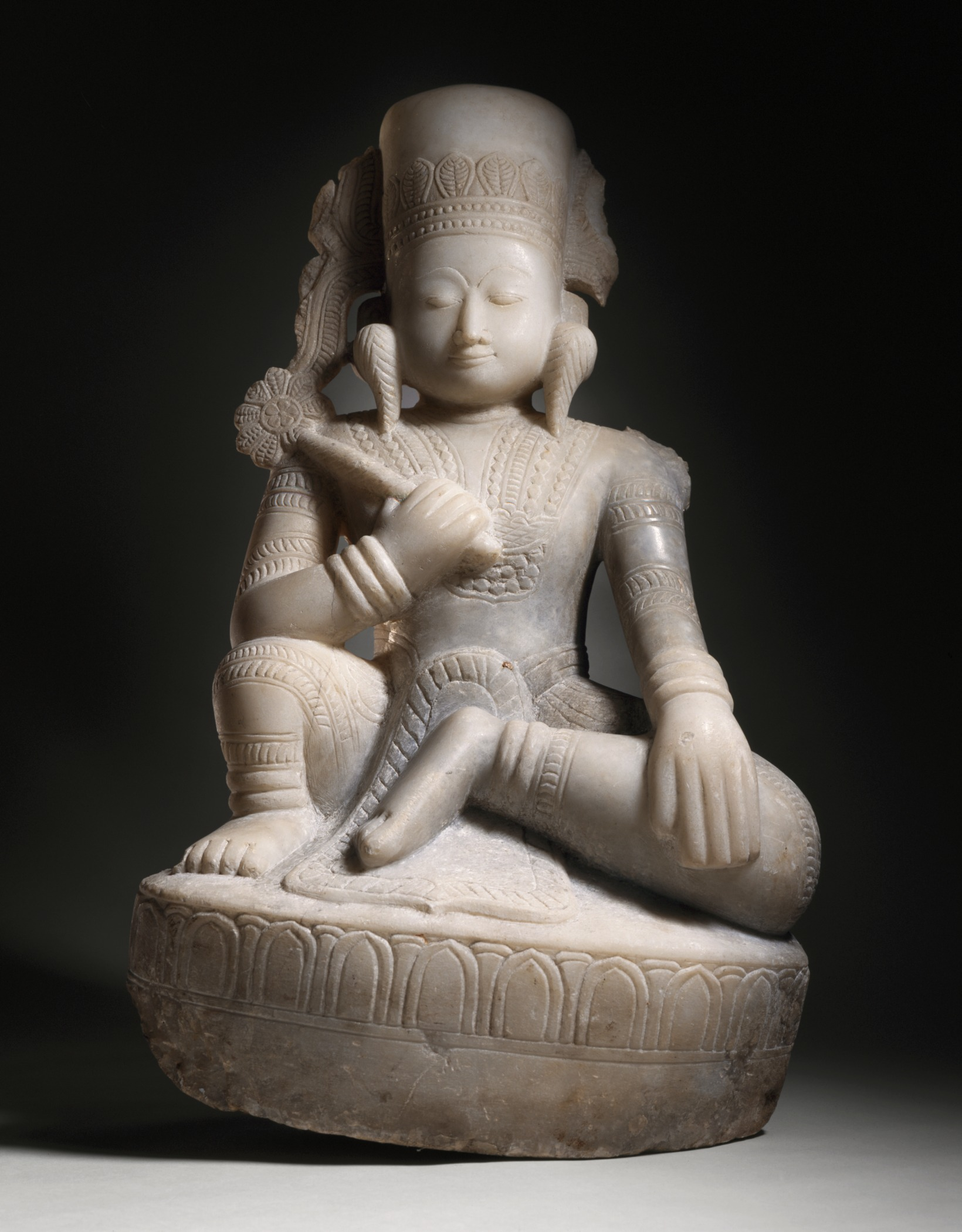
18th-century depiction of the Lokanātha (Loka Byuha Nat)

Bayinnaung also promoted mass ordinations into the Sinhala Sangha at the Kalyani Ordination Hall in the name of purifying the religion. He also prohibited all human and animal sacrifices throughout the kingdom. In particular, he forbade the Shan practice of killing the slaves and animals belonging to a saopha at his funeral. He also sent Burmese Theravada monks to preach in the Shan realm. During his reign, there were great scholars such as Saddhammalamkara, Dhammabuddha and Ananda (known for his commentary on the Dhammasanghani's Abhidhammamatika).

Bayinnaung's reforms were continued by the monarchs of the Restored Toungoo dynasty, who spent much of their efforts in religious projects. An important later king was Thalun (1584–1648), known for building a number of monasteries and chedis in Upper Burma and other acts of donation to the sangha. He also patronized various learned elders of his era, such as Tipitakalamkara, Ariyalamkara and Jambudhaja. Tipitakalamkara is the author of the Vinayalamkara and a commentary to the Atthasalini, while Jambhudhaja composed a commentary on the Vinayatthakatha.

Thalun's successor Pindale (1648–1661) also followed in his father's footsteps, building monasteries and patronizing Buddhist scholarship by figures such as Aggadhammalamkara, a great translator of various Abhidhamma works into Burmese (including the Patthana and the Dhammasangani). His Taungoo successors also promoted learning and further construction projects for the sangha.

In the 17th and 18th centuries, Theravada practices became more regionally uniform, and the hill regions were drawn into closer contact with the basin. The consistent royal support of the Mahavihara Theravada tradition and the pacification of the Shan hill region led to the growth of rural monasteries (kyaungs), which became a near universal feature of Burmese village life.

The rural monasteries were the main center of education and by the 18th century the large majority of village males were learning to read and write in these monasteries. As literacy became more common (over 50 percent among males), the cost of transcribing and writing Buddhist texts decreased and they thus became more commonly available.

The 17th century saw a growth in the interest of Abhidhamma study and the translation of various classic works of Abhidhamma into the Burmese language, including the Atthasalini and the Abhidhammatthasangaha. This made the Abhidhamma more accessible to a much wider audience which probably included lay people.

At the same time, the Ari "Forest dweller" sect with their large landed estates virtually disappeared in this period due to various economic and political pressures. However, in spite of these changes and reforms, some animist and esoteric practices like nat worship and the Weikza remained popular throughout Burma.

During the reign of King Sanay (1673–1714), a great controversy swept the sangha over whether it was acceptable to wear the monk's robe so as to leave one shoulder exposed. This dispute would consume the sangha for almost a century.

=== Konbaung dynasty ===
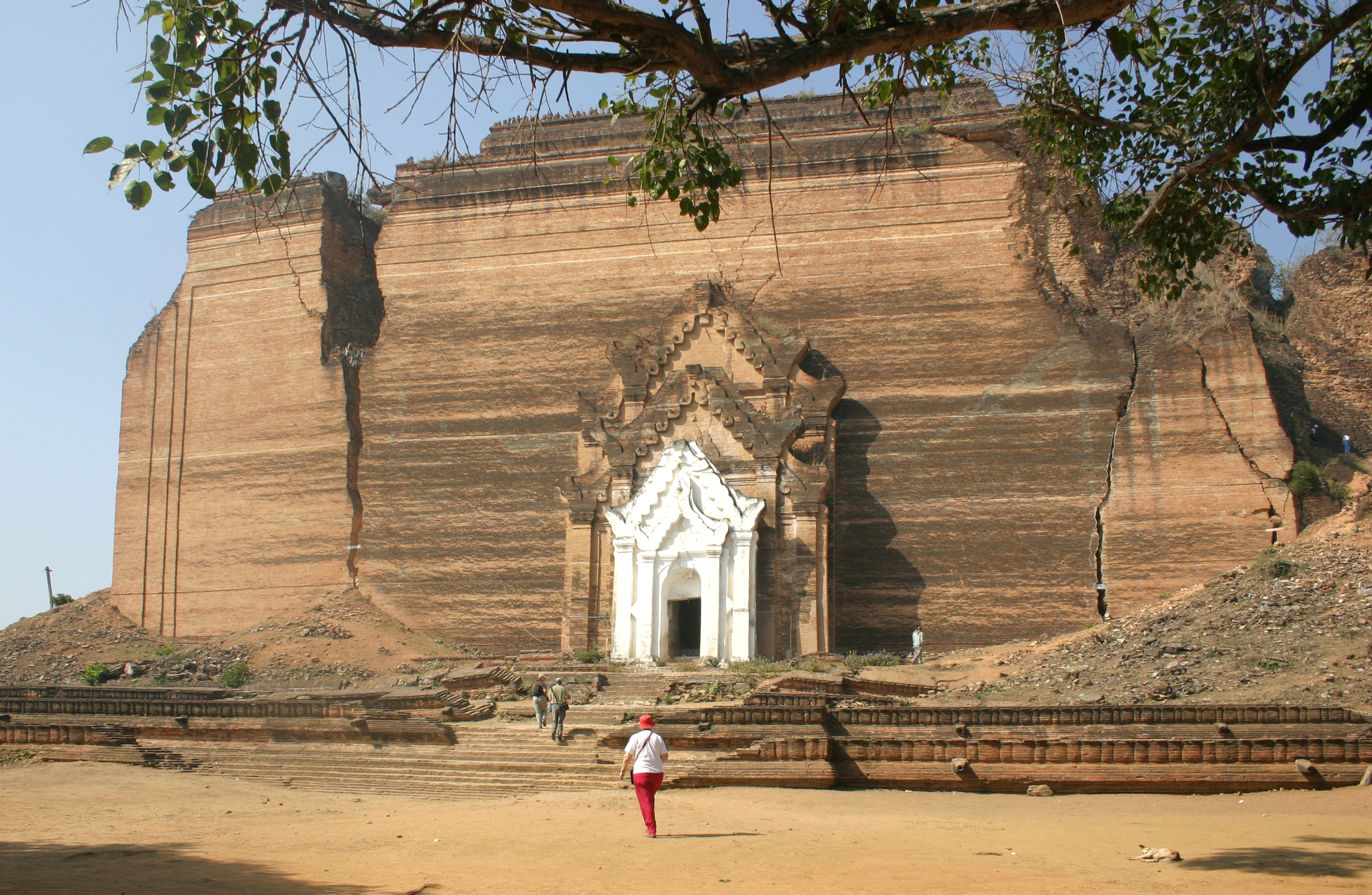
The unfinished Mingun Pahtodawgyi of Bodawpaya, intended to be the largest stupa in the world

In the mid-18th century, King Alaungpaya (1714–1760) established the Konbaung dynasty (1752–1885) after a short period of rebellion and warfare.

His son, Bodawpaya (1745–1819), arbitrated the dispute concerning the correct way of wearing the monk robes by ruling in favour of covering both shoulders and the sangha was then unified under the Sudhammā Nikāya.

Bodawpaya, a devout Buddhist, attempted to reform the sangha, aiming at a standard code of discipline and strict obedience to the scriptures. These reforms were known as the Sudhammā reforms. He appointed a council of sangharajas as leaders of the sangha, tasked with maintaining monastic discipline. He also appointed a sangha head (sasanabaing), Maung-daung Sayadaw, which was allowed to use the office and resources of the Royal Council to examine monks and defrock them if necessary. Various monks that did not meet the new standard were expelled from the sangha.

There were also monthly recitations of the vinaya in numerous cities throughout the realm. Regular examinations for monks were also organized, though this was a practice which had existed at least since the time of King Sinbyushin (1763–1776). If monks repeatedly failed their exams, they could be expelled from the sangha. Bodawpaya also made many donations to the Buddhist order, including regular food offerings, numerous copies of the Tipitaka and a wave of monastery and pagoda construction in the capital of Amarapura as well as the creation of animal sanctuaries (where hunting was prohibited). Bodawpaya also built numerous monasteries for learned Buddhist elders. One of the most learned scholars of this era was elder Ñāṇa, who wrote numerous works including commentaries on the Nettipakarana, the Jatakatthakatha and the Digha Nikaya.

Bodawpaya also sent many monks trained in vinaya to the provinces to enforce monastic standards and others were sent to preach the dharma in places “where the religion was not flourishing”. Bodawpaya's policies also led to the persecution of the heretical Zoti (Joti/Zawti) sect, who rejected rebirth and believed in an omniscient creator nat who judged individuals after death for eternity. Under his auspices, the upasampada ordination was also re-introduced to Sri Lanka where it established the Amarapura Nikaya. Bodawpaya also attempted to regulate the ethics of the lay population. He banned liquor, opium, cannabis and the killing of animals in his capital. He also appealed to the lay population to keep the 5 precepts and the 8 precepts during the uposatha days.

According to Lieberman, the Konbaung crown was thoroughly involved in numerous different religious matters such as:

- appointing capital and provincial abbots,
- conducting regular monastic examinations,
- disseminating “purified” copies of the Tipitaka,
- sending missionaries to outlying provinces.
- issuing new explicitly Buddhist law codes
- outlawed liquor with severe punishment for recidivism
- harassing heretics and Muslims
- forbidding of animal slaughter in the cities
- the promotion of an official pantheon of 37 nats

Konbaung era monastic and lay elites also launched a major reformation of Burmese intellectual life and monasticism, known as the Sudhamma Reformation. It led to, amongst other things, Burma's first proper state histories. It was during this era that the Thathana-wun-tha (Sasanavamsa, "Chronicle of the Buddhist religion") was written (1831).

Konbaung era monastics also wrote new commentaries on the canon. A key figure of this intellectual movement was the ascetic and sangharaja Ñāṇabhivamsa, who wrote commentaries on the Nettippakarana and other works as well as a sub-commentary on the Digha Nikaya. Furthermore, there was an increase in translations of Pali Buddhist works into the Burmese language. In the first half of the 19th century, almost the entire Sutta Pitaka became available in Burmese, and numerous commentaries continued to be composed on it. Buddhist texts also became much more widely available due to the growth of the use of modern printing methods.

During the Konbaung period, alcohol consumption became frowned upon at all social levels (though it of course continued in private). Ritualized public drinking was eventually replaced by the public drinking of pickled tea. The public slaughter and sale of meat (not fish) also ceased in the major towns. Government edicts were also passed against opium, opium derivatives, gambling, and prostitution as well as alcohol and hunting.

In the villages, rituals became more standardized, based on orthodox Theravada merit-making and monastics became objects of popular veneration. Popular culture also "became suffused with the Jatakas and Buddhist maxims." Indeed, Theravada Buddhism achieved an "unqualified superiority" in this era over the nat cults.

It was also during this period that the first vipassana meditation teachers began to popularize the widespread practice of Buddhist meditation. This included figures like the monks Waya-zawta and Medawi (1728–1816). Waya-zawta flourished during the reign of Mahadhammayaza (1733–1752) and promised his followers could reach sotapanna through anagami levels of awakening under him. Medawi was the first author of Burmese language vipassana meditation manuals (completing over thirty of these), focusing on the three marks of existence as they pertain to the five aggregates. Medawi promoted meditation as the way to prevent the decline of the Buddha's religion. He held that the Buddha's teaching was in decline only because people were not practicing it, and not, as others believed, because they lived in degenerate times.

Alongside of all the Theravada Buddhist activity, non-Buddhist rites and practices continued throughout the Konbaung era. These include the worship of ancestors, Hindu gods like Ganesha and Vishnu, and the Burmese nat spirits (which sometimes even included ceremonial sacrifices of living beings).

== Modern era ==
=== Reign of Mindon Min (1853–1878) ===
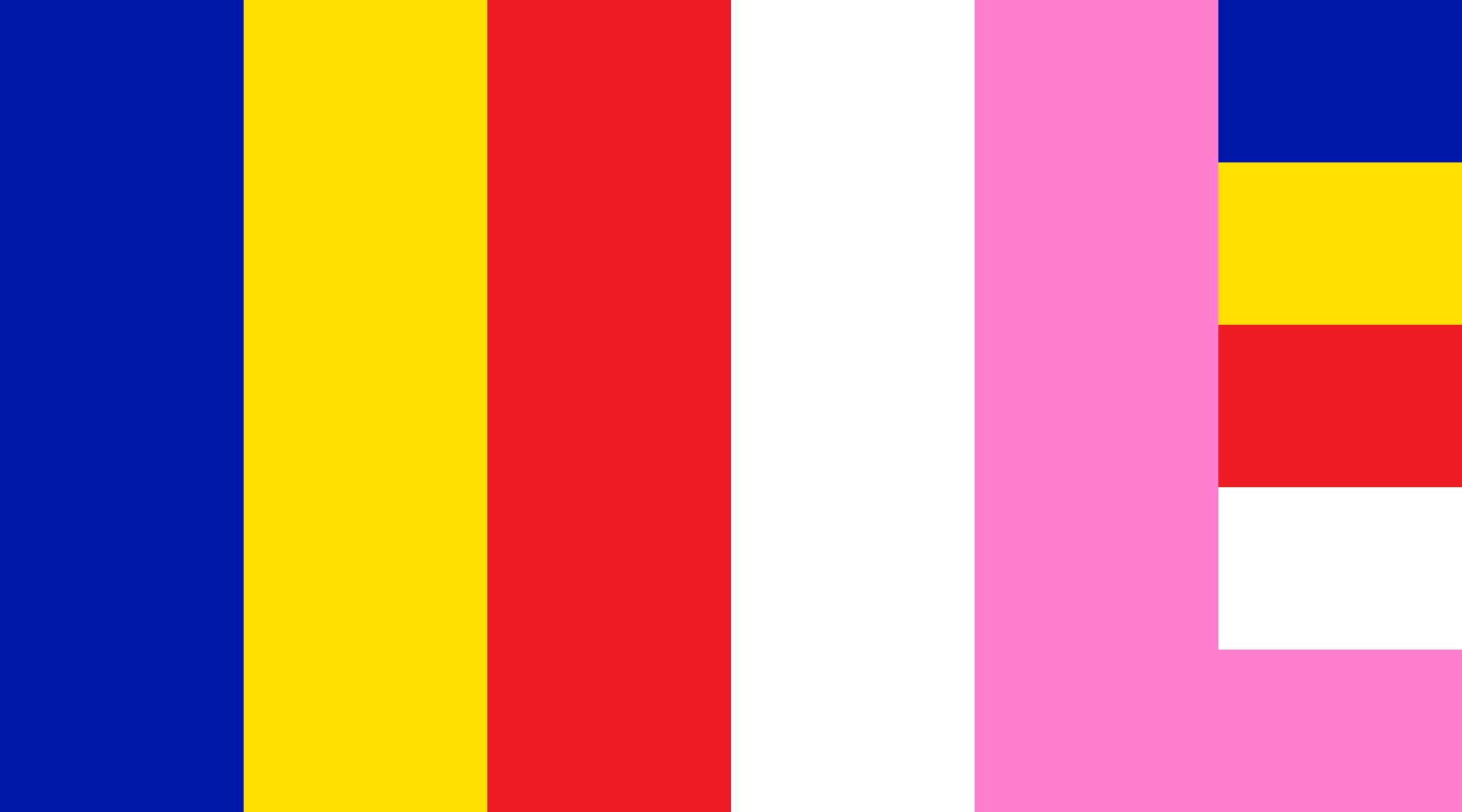
Burmese Buddhist flag

King Mindon Min is a key figure in the modernization of Burmese Buddhism. He became king after Lower Burma had been conquered by the British in 1852. Mindon spent most of his reign, which was generally peaceful, attempting to modernize his realm and reform the sangha.

After the Second Anglo-Burmese War concluded, many monks from Lower Burma had resettled in Mandalay, having fled there during the war. Mindon Min attempted to convince these bhikkhus to return to Lower Burma so that they might continue to educate the people in Buddhism. Some of these monks did return.

However, many of the monks in Lower Burma began to group together under certain local leaders who saw themselves as outside of royal control. One of these figures was Okpo Sayadaw, who taught that the sangha did not need the protection of a secular elite power as long as it strictly kept the monastic discipline. His movement also challenged the authority of the Thudhamma sect, and took new ordinations by themselves. His ideas also reached Upper Burma and gained popularity there.

Meanwhile, in Upper Burma, many monks were now moving out of the capital to Sagaing hills, seeking an environment that was stricter than the capital which they saw as promoting lavish lifestyles. At this time, the Sagaing hills area became a center for more strict monastic practice. One of monks who left for Sagaing was the Ngettwin Sayadaw. He was a popular figure, known for criticizing many traditional religious practices. Ngettwin Sayadaw, the 'Bird-cave Abbot' of Sagaing Hills, required his monks to practice vipassana meditation daily and keep a strict discipline. He also advised laypersons to meditate instead of give offerings to Buddha images (which he said were fruitless). Another important figure of this period was Thingazar Sayadaw, who also stressed the importance of meditation practice and strict Vinaya.

Fearing that the Buddhist religion was in danger from colonialism and internal division, Mindon patronized and convened the Fifth Buddhist Council from 1868 to 1871. At this council, the Pali canon was recited and edited to create a new edition and remove scribal transmission errors. When this was done, Mindon patronized the creation of a collection of 729 stone tablets inscribed with the new edition of the Pali canon. It remains the world's largest book. The tablets were then stored in 729 small pagodas at the Kuthodaw Pagoda complex.

Mindon's reign also saw the production of new scholarly works and translations of Pali texts. Ñeyyadhamma, the royal preceptor, wrote a sub-commentary to the Majjhima Nikaya (which had been translated into Burmese by his disciples). Paññasami (author of the Sasanavamsa) also wrote numerous Pali works in this era, like the Silakatha, and the Upayakatha.

Another important Buddhist policy of Mindon was the establishment of animal sanctuaries, particularly outside Sagaing, at Maungdaung (near Alon), near the lower Chindwin and around Meiktila lake.

=== British rule ===
After Mindon's death in 1877 his son Thibaw ascended the throne. Thibaw was weak and unable to prevent the British conquest of Upper Burma in 1886. This was an epoch making change, since the Buddhist sangha had now lost the support of the Burmese state for the first time in centuries.

During the British administration of Lower and Upper Burma (from 1824 to 1948), government policies were generally secular which meant Buddhism and its institutions were not patronised or protected by the colonial government. Furthermore, monks who broke the vinaya now went unpunished by the government. The presence of Christian missionaries and missionary schools also became widespread. This resulted in tensions between the Buddhists, Christians and Europeans in Colonial Burma.

As the authority and prestige of the sangha yielded to that of western educated colonial elites (and with the rise of western education in Burma), there was a general feeling among Burmese Buddhists during the colonial era that the Buddhist dispensation (sasana) was in decline and in danger of dying out. Not only did Buddhism now lack state support, but many of the traditional jobs of the Burmese sangha, especially education, were being taken by secular institutions.

The response to this perceived decline was a mass reform movement throughout the country which responded in different ways to the colonial situation. This included waves of Buddhist publishing, preaching, and the founding of hundreds of lay Buddhist organizations, as well as the promotion of vegetarianism, Buddhist education, moral and religious reform and the founding of schools. Lay persons, including working class individuals such as schoolteachers, and clerks, merchants were quite prominent in this Buddhist revival. They now assumed the responsibility of preserving the sasana, one which had previously been taken by the king and royal elites.

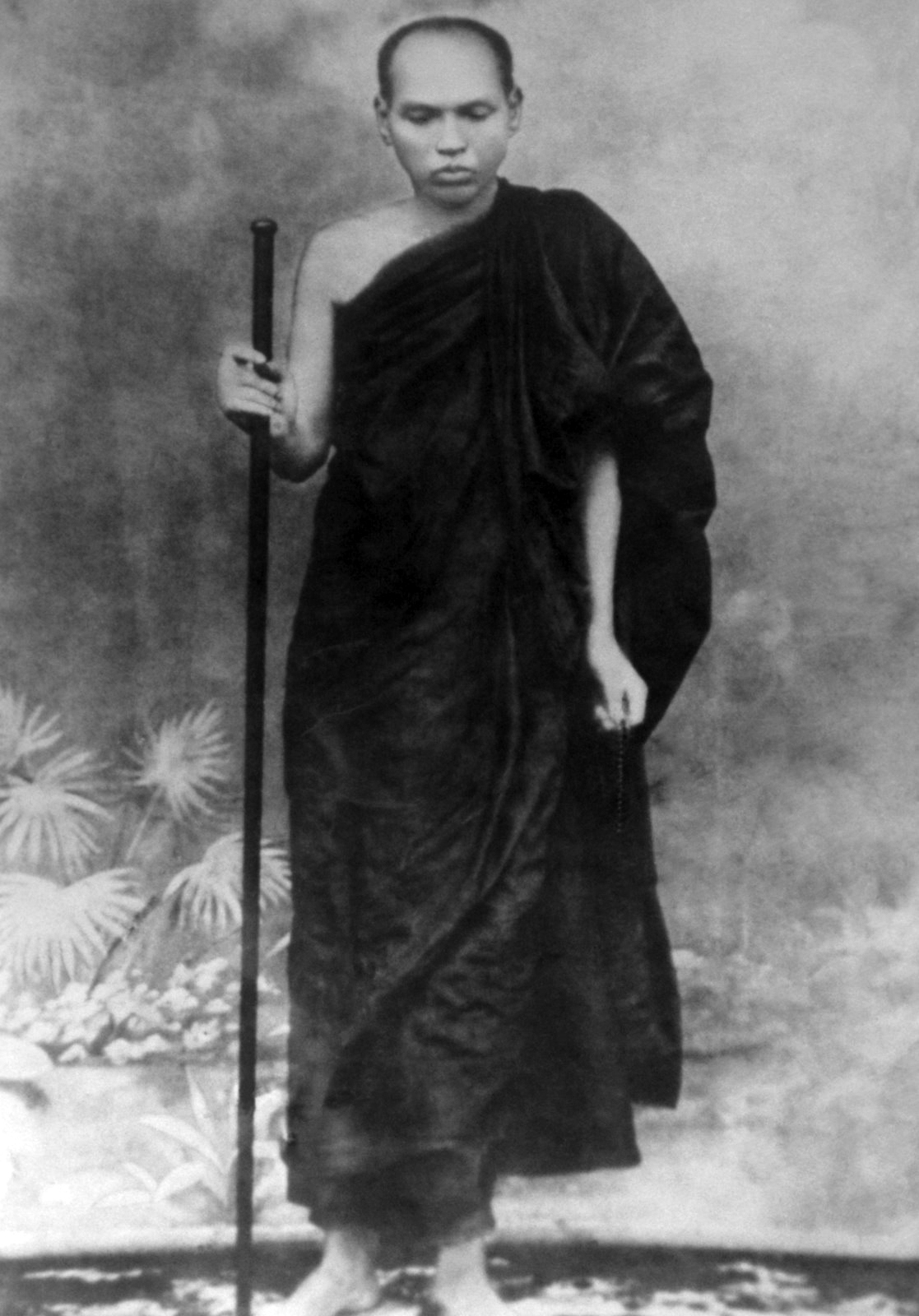
Ledi Sayadaw

An important part of this revival movement was the widespread promotion of Buddhist doctrinal learning (especially of the Abhidhamma) coupled with the practice of meditation (among the monastic and lay communities). Ledi Sayadaw (1846–1923) became an influential figure of this "vipassana movement", which was seen as a way to safeguard and preserve Buddhism. He traveled widely teaching and preaching, and also founded numerous lay study and meditation groups. He also wrote voluminously. His output included meditation manuals and the Paramattha Sankhip, which was a Burmese verse translation of the Abhidhammatthasaṅgaha. According to Ledi, the study of this text and the practice of meditation allowed even laypersons to attain awakening "in this very life." His teachings were extremely influential for the later post-colonial spread of meditation by figures such as U Ba Khin, S. N. Goenka, and Mahasi Sayadaw.

According to Patrick Pranke, during the same period that the vipassana movement was growing, another alternative soteriological system called weikza-lam ("Path of esoteric knowledge") was also developing. The major goal of weikza path is not the attainment of arhatship, but the attainment of virtual immortality as a weikza ("wizard"). This system is one "whose methods and orientation fall largely outside the parameters of contemporary Theravāda orthodoxy."

A weikza-do (Pali: vijjā-dhara) is a Buddhist wizard believed to have esoteric powers which he uses to defend the Buddhist dispensation and assist good people. The archetypal weikza include figures like Bo Min Gaung and Bo Bo Aung (though there is a diverse pantheon of weikzas). Weikzas are typically portrayed as a white clad layman who awaits the arrival of the future Buddha Metteya and extends his life through alchemy and magic.

During 19th and 20th century, numerous weikza-lam associations were founded, many of which believed in a millenarian myth which said that a righteous king called Setkya-min would defeat evil (along with Bo Bo Aung) and usher in a golden age in preparation for the arrival of Metteya. Other weikza followers do not subscribe to this unorthodox myth and simply wish to extend their lives so that they may live long enough to meet the next Buddha. While the practice of magic (for healing, immortality, magical protection and other ends) is a key element of weikza path, normative Buddhist practices like the five precepts and samatha meditation are also important in weikza-lam.

During this time, there was also widespread opposition to the conversion efforts of Christian missionaries. One unique figure in this fight was the popular Irish Buddhist monk U Dhammaloka, who became a widely celebrated public preacher and polemicist against colonialism and Christian missionaries.

During the colonial period, the future of the Burmese nation was seen as closely tied to the future of the Buddhist dispensation. For the ethnic Burmese people, Burmese nationalism was almost inseparable from their Buddhist identity. Indeed, a common slogan of the independence movement was "To be Burmese means to be Buddhist".

Therefore, many monks often participated in the nationalist struggle for independence, even though the majority of the senior monks leading the Burmese Sangha spoke out against monks participating in politics. They saw such activities as being contrary to the Vinaya rules. Likewise, many of the lay Buddhist organizations and their key organizers would also take part in the nationalist movement. One of the first and most influential of these nationalist Buddhist organizations was the Young Men's Buddhist Association (YMBA), founded in 1906. They were the first organization to cooperate with politicized monks.

Politically involved monks included figures such as U Ottama, who argued that British rule was an obstacle to the practice of Buddhism and thus independence had to be gained, through violent means if necessary, though he also promoted Gandhian tactics like boycotts and tax avoidance. In support of the use of violence, he quoted some Jatakas. He was arrested numerous times and died in jail, becoming a sort of martyr for the independence movement. However, Lehr points out that monastic political agitation "did not sit well with the population at large since this open participation in anti-colonial politics, or in social activism, was deemed to be a violation of the monastic rules." The reputation of the activist monks was further damaged by the participation of a small group of monks in the anti-Indian Indo-Burmese riots of 1938.

=== Parliamentary era ===
Since 1948 when the country gained its independence from Great Britain, both civil and military governments have supported Burmese Theravada Buddhism. The Ministry of Religious Affairs, created in 1948, was responsible for administering Buddhist affairs in Myanmar.

The first Burmese prime minister, U Nu was influenced by socialist principles and was also a devout Buddhist who promoted a kind of Buddhist socialism. In 1954, U Nu, convened the Sixth Buddhist Synod at the newly built Kaba Aye Pagoda and Maha Pasana Guha (Great Cave) in Rangoon (Yangon). It was attended by 2,500 monks, and established the International Institute for Advanced Buddhist studies, located on the premises of the Kaba Aye Pagoda. The main output of the council was the a new version of the Pali Canon, the "Sixth Council Tipitaka" (Chaṭṭha Saṅgāyana Tipiṭaka).

U Nu also led to make Buddhism as the State Religion. The Union Parliament passed and the president Mahn Win Maung enacted the followings; the 1961 Act of the Third Amendment of the Constitution (that amended the 1947 Constitution to make Buddhism as State Religion) on 26 August 1961, and the State Religion Promotion and Support Act on 2 October 1961. U Nu also made the uposatha days public holidays, required government schools to teach Buddhist students the Buddhist scriptures, banned cattle slaughter, and commuted some death sentences. While U Nu was overthrown as prime minister by Ne Win (who undid some of U Nu's religious policies) in 1962, he continued to travel and to teach Buddhism and remained an important Burmese spiritual leader and literary figure.

During the parliamentary era, Buddhism also became an ideological barrier against communism. Both U Nu and Burmese monk and philosopher U Kelatha argued that Buddhism had to counter the Marxist Materialist philosophy which was against the teachings of the Buddha and a threat to Buddhism.

During the 20th century, the Burmese vipassana meditation movement also continued to grow and expand. Numerous monks and lay students developed various methods of meditation and there are many meditation centers and meditation monasteries. Influential figures of 20th century Burmese Buddhist meditation include U Nārada, Mahasi Sayadaw and Sayadaw U Pandita (who promoted what is called the "new Burmese method"), Webu Sayadaw, U Ba Khin and his student S.N. Goenka, Mogok Sayadaw, Sunlun Sayadaw, and Pa Auk Sayadaw (who emphasizes the jhanas as taught in the Visuddhimagga). Numerous western students also studied Burmese Buddhist meditation and brought it to the west as part of what is sometimes called the insight meditation (or vipassana) movement. This includes figures like Jack Kornfield, Joseph Goldstein and Sharon Salzberg.

=== Burmese Way to Socialism ===
The 1947 constitution was suspended in 1962. But the State Religion Promotion Act remains.

The military and socialist governments led by Ne Win and his followers attempted to reform Myanmar under the "Burmese Way to Socialism" which contained elements of Buddhism and Socialism. The constitution adopted in 1974 doesn't contain mentioning of a religion as a State Religion. They also cracked down on activist monks as part of a "cleaning up the sangha" reform, which saw monasteries raided and numerous politically active monks forcefully disrobed and jailed. Some monks were even tortured and died in jail.

Ne Win also tried to push for monks to register with the government, but this was strongly resisted by the Burmese sanghas. It was only during 1980–81 that general Sein Lwin, serving as Minister of Home and Religious Affairs, finally forced all monks to register and get their own ID cards with the government. He also formed the 47-member State Sangha Maha Nayaka Committee as a governing body for all monks in the country who had the power to disrobe "misbehaving" monks (i.e. politically involved monks). Numerous monks were attacked and persecuted during this period. Even highly respected figures like Mahasi Sayadaw and Mingun Sayadaw were targeted (since they had shown reluctance to work with the new Maha Nayaka Committee).

The economic policy of these governments, which was based on widespread nationalisation, have widely been seen as a major failure which turned Burma into one of the world's poorest countries. These failures and the constant political repression led to the 8888 Nationwide Popular Pro-Democracy Protests of 1988, which saw massive demonstrations throughout the country.

Many Buddhist monks participated, particularly those of the All Burma Monks’ Alliance (ABMA). These monks were persecuted by Burmese military during their crackdown on the protesters, many monks were killed. During the chaos that ensued during the protests, Buddhist monks were at the forefront of the attempt to establish some sort of order in the towns and cities of Burma (before the military re-established control in 1989). Many organized day-to-day affairs like trash collecting, directing traffic and even policing.

Buddhist monks continued to protest and defy the military government and the military continued to respond with force, such as when a group of monks who were protesting in Mandalay were fired upon in 1990. In response, thousands of monks decided to boycott the donations from anyone associated with the military and their families (and refusing to perform rites for them). The army responded by raiding 133 monasteries and arresting numerous monks in late 1990 and early 1991. These arrests included various respected senior abbots like U Thumingala. Most were forced to disrobe and sent to labor camps. At this point, most of the pro-democracy movement crumbled. State propaganda meanwhile showed military leaders visiting monasteries and donating to monks.

The succeeding military regime, the State Peace and Development Council (SPDC), did patronise Buddhist monasteries and some leading monks in order to attempt to legitimize their rule. They also placed monks which were supportive of the military in high positions. Senior military leaders continue to sponsor the renovations of pagodas and donate gifts to monks, which is then depicted in the state controlled media (though numerous Burmese remain suspicious of these displays). Meanwhile, persecution of Buddhists contrary to the regime, as well as persons of other religions and ethnic groups, continued. This also has led to rising ethnic tensions. One of the few Buddhist monks who successfully resisted being co-opted by the state was the Thamanya Sayadaw, a widely revered and respected figure.

One of the key leaders of the democracy movement, Aung San Suu Kyi, has often spoken of the importance of Buddhism for the Burmese people, for the democracy movement and for her own personal struggles. Her association with the Thamanya Sayadaw contributed to her rising popularity and her speeches often include Buddhist themes.

During the pro-democracy Saffron Revolution (2007), thousands of Buddhist monks were widely involved in the protests. When the military broke up the protests, many monasteries were raided and numerous monks were jailed, beaten, tortured and even killed. Others were sent to isolated labor camps. U Gambira was an influential activist monk of the Burmese pro-democracy movement and is the leader of the All Burma Monks' Alliance (which was founded by U Nat Zaw). The Burmese monks were supported by a regional network of Buddhist activists from Sri Lanka, Thailand, Malaysia and Singapore. During and after the crackdown, many such as U Nat Zaw managed to leave the country.

The extreme crackdown on the Buddhist sangha (one of the worst in history) led to much loss of legitimacy for the military government in the eyes of many Burmese. It also discredited the State Sangha Maha Nayaka Committee, the official leadership body of the Sangha which sided with the military. Pro democracy activities continue under the "Saffron Monks Network," who works to educate and politicize fellow monks. Buddhist monks and temples were also at the forefront of unofficial relief efforts during the aftermath of cyclone Nargis, and many monasteries and pagodas served as temporary shelters for displaced Burmese.

There has also recently been a rise in Buddhist monks espousing anti-Muslim nationalist sentiments. One of the most infamous of which is Ashin Wirathu, who believes most Muslims are violent radicals who are raping Burmese women throughout Burma. He fears that Muslims (with a higher birthrate and foreign support) will take over Burma unless they are stopped, through the use of violence if necessary. There are several ultra-nationalist Buddhist organizations in contemporary Myanmar, such as Ma Ba Tha ("Patriotic Association of Myanmar") and the 969 Movement.

Despite the activities of numerous different types of activist monks (whether it is pro-democracy or ultra-nationalist types), the "silent majority" of the Burmese sangha generally frowns upon monastics taking part in political activity. Many Burmese monks do not see politics as something that Buddhist bhikkhus should be participating in (and believe they should disrobe if they wish to enter politics).

== Religious practices and traditions ==
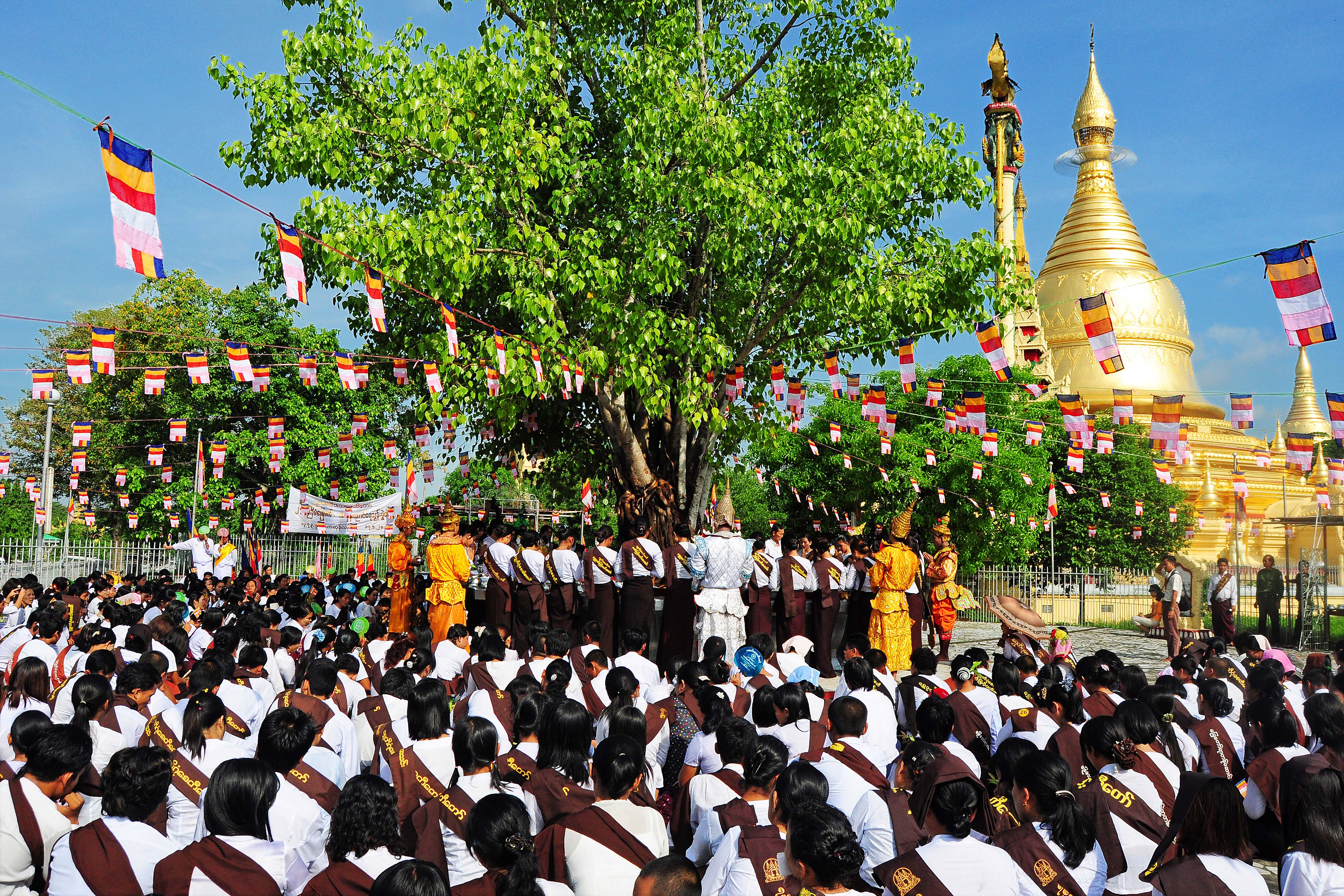
Burmese Buddhist devotees converge on a Bodhi tree in preparation for watering.

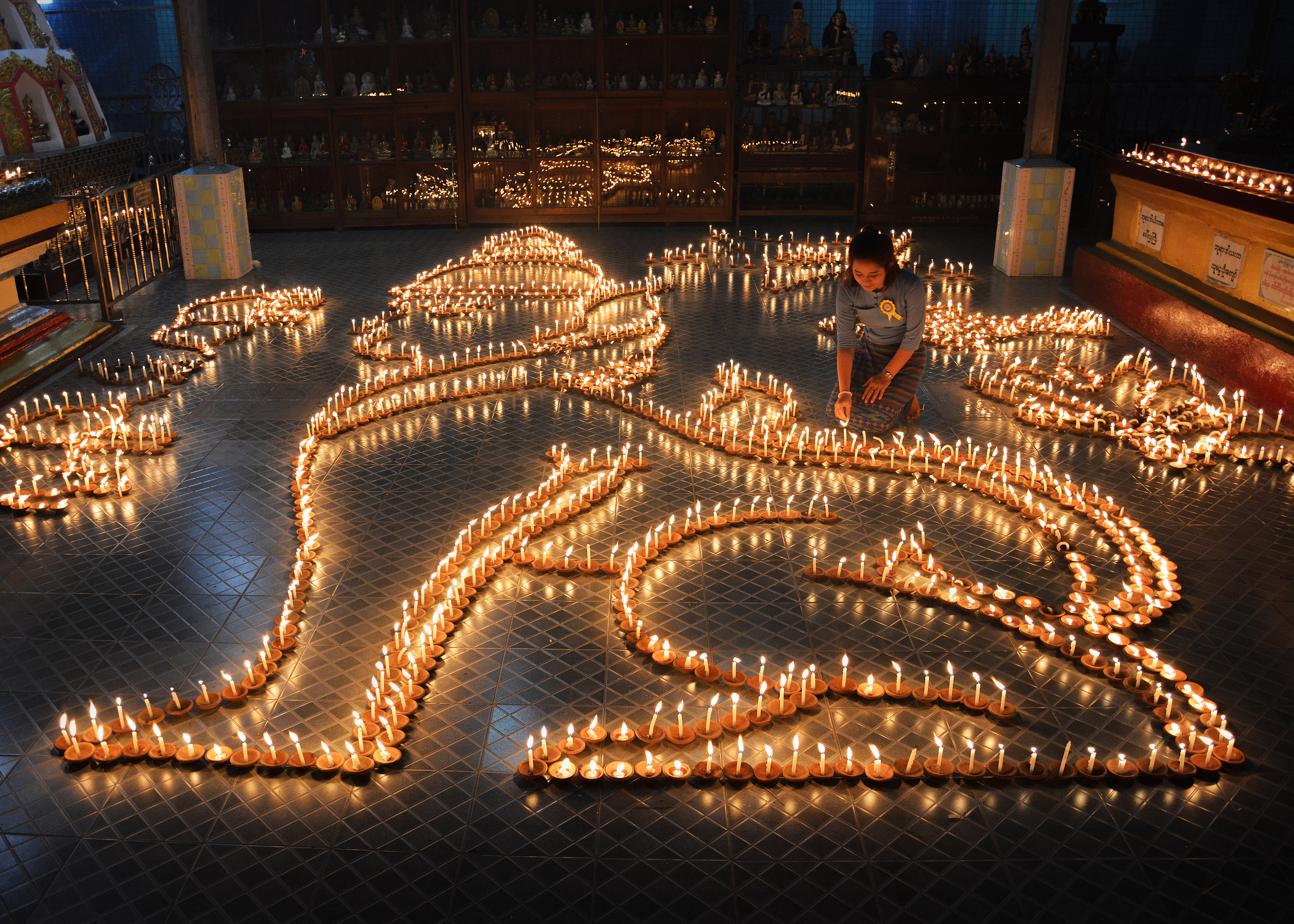
Lighting candles during the Festival of lights

=== Festivals ===
The culture of Myanmar is influenced by Buddhism. There are many Burmese traditional festivals all through the year, and most of them are related to Buddhism. Common activities include vising pagodas or local monasteries, donating food to the monastics, taking the eight precepts, and attending parades.

The Burmese New Year (Thingyan), also known as the Water Festival, has its origins in Indian traditions. It is also a time when many Burmese boys celebrate shinbyu, a special rite of passage by which a boy enters the monastery for a short time as a sāmaṇera. Thingyan usually falls in mid-April and tops the list of Public holidays in Myanmar.

Vesak, also known as the full moon day of Kason, is the most sacred of all holidays, as it marks the Buddha's birth, awakening and death. Buddhists may celebrate by offering alms to monastics, keeping the eight precepts, practicing meditation, and freeing animals from captivity. Kason is also celebrated by watering Bodhi Trees during the Bodhi tree watering festival (Nyaungye-thun). Other popular festivals include the Dhammasekya Day celebration, the Festival of Lights and the pagoda festivals.

Pagoda festivals (ဘုရားပွဲ Paya pwè) held throughout the country also usually fall on full moon days and most of them will be on the full moon of Tabaung (February/March) including the Shwedagon Pagoda. They attract not only crowds of pilgrims from near and far, often in caravans of bullock carts, but they also double as great market fairs where both local and itinerant traders set up their stalls and shops among food stalls, restaurants, and free open-air stage performances as well as theatre halls.

=== Veneration and devotion ===
A Burmese Buddhist household usually contains an altar or shrine to the Buddha, with at least one dedicated image or statue of Gautama Buddha (known as a buddharupa). Likewise, Buddhist temples and monasteries also contain larger Buddha statues in their main halls, sometimes the Buddha statue will be flanked by statues of the Buddha's disciples (Sariputta and Mahamoggallana).

A Buddha image is commonly placed on a "throne" called a gaw pallin (ဂေါ့ပလ္လင်, from Pali pallanka). Flowers, candles, food and other offerings are commonly placed in front of the Buddha statue.

Before a Buddha statue is used for veneration, it must be formally consecrated, in a ritual called buddhābhiseka or anay gaza tin (အနေကဇာတင်ခြင်း). This consecration, led by a Buddhist monk, including various offerings (candles, flowers, etc.) and chanting of paritta and other verses such as aneka jāti saṃsāraṃ ("through the round of many births I roamed"), the 153rd verse of the Dhammapada (found in the 11th chapter).

The consecration rituals are believed to imbue the Buddha image with a sacred quality that can protect the surroundings from misfortune and symbolically embody the powers of the Buddha.

Common devotional practices which are done at home or in a temple include the taking of refuge in the three jewels (usually by reciting a popular formula), the chanting of key scriptural verses (such as parittas like the Mangala Sutta and the Metta Sutta), respectful salutation with joined palms (anjali) and the "five limb prostration". The chanting of Buddhist scripture is also part of Burmese Buddhist funerals as well as other important occasions.

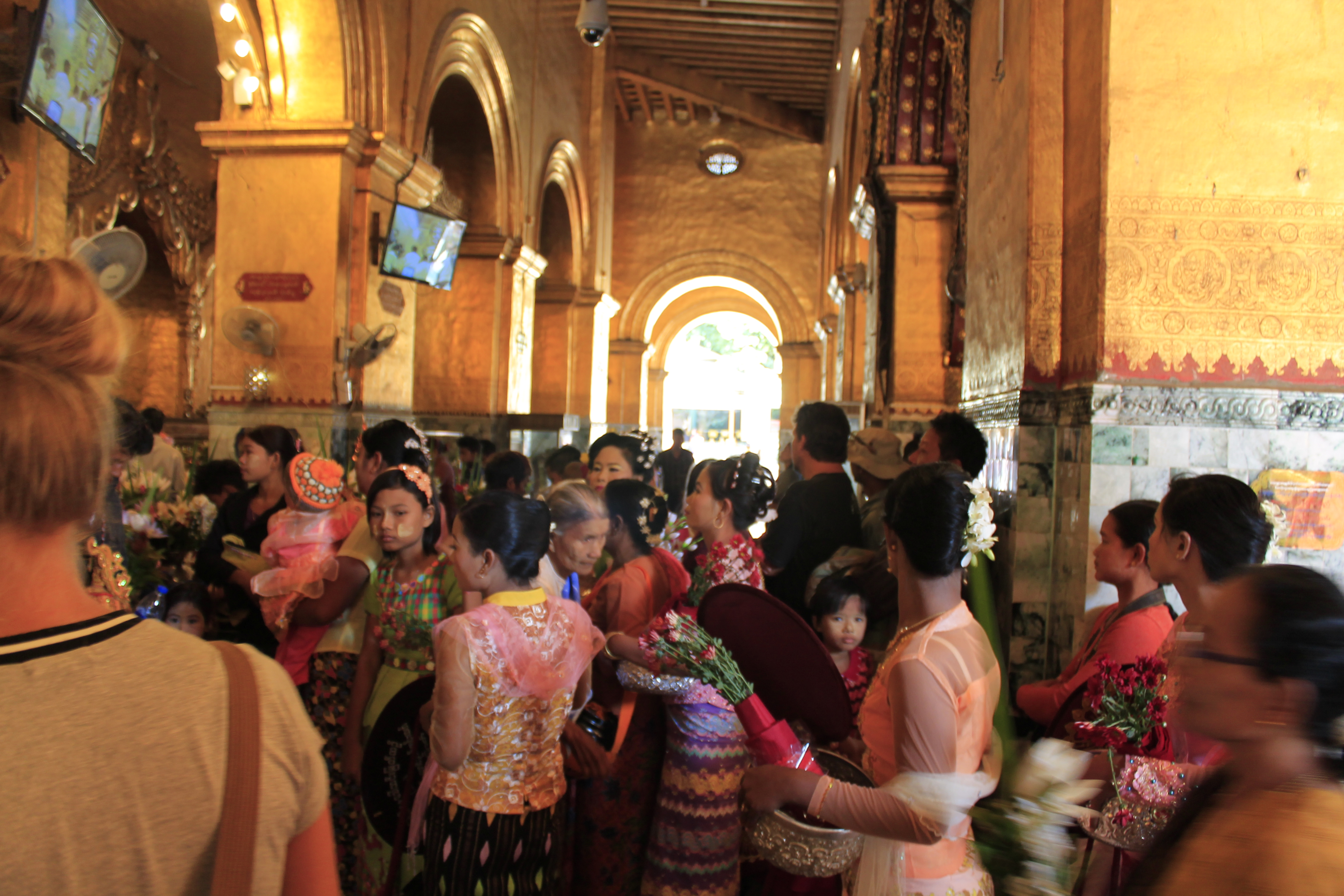
Worshippers at the Mahamuni Buddha Temple in Mandalay

=== Ethics and merit ===
A central element of Burmese Buddhist practice is making merit or goodness (Pali: puñña). This generally involves doing certain good deeds, such as donating food and other things to Buddhist monastics. Buddhists believe that wholesome actions (kusala kamma) will create good karmic fruits or results (phala) in this life and in the next life.

Another important element of Burmese Buddhist ethics is the keeping of "precepts" or "trainings". The most basic set of ethical precepts are the five precepts (abstaining from killing, stealing, lying, adultery and alcohol). There are also extra precepts (see: eight precepts) that Burmese laypersons may take occasionally, during religious holidays, the uposatha days and meditation retreats. It is a traditional practice to request a Buddhist monastic to bestow the precepts on a layperson by chanting the precepts in the Pali language.

On days of the lunar observance or uposatha (which typically occur about once a week), Buddhist laypersons may take on extra precepts and visit a Buddhist temple to make merit and practice more intensely.

Another common practice is for Buddhist monks to give sermons or "Dhamma talks" to the laity and junior monks. It is believed that listening to the Buddha's teachings is a meritorious activity. Burmese Monks will often address the laypersons in an informal and conversational style, called a "fan down" sermon, which uses plain language and may include humor. This contrasts which a more ancient and ritualized "fan up" (which refers to how monks would cover their face with a fan) sermon which was often done in Pali and was mostly incomprehensible to laypersons.

Though most Burmese eat meat, some prominent Burmese Buddhist monks have promoted vegetarianism as a wholesome and compassionate diet. These figures include the popular Thamanya Sayadaw and his followers, who promote a vegetarian diet as a useful way to cultivate metta. Mahasi Sayadaw has also recommended vegetarianism as the best way to make sure one's meal is "pure in three ways." This refers to the rule the Buddha laid down, which allows monks to eat meat only if it is not seen, heard or suspected that the animal was killed specifically for them. Burmese Buddhists also generally avoid jobs that entail the killing of animals, since it would be a wrong livelihood.

=== Meditation ===
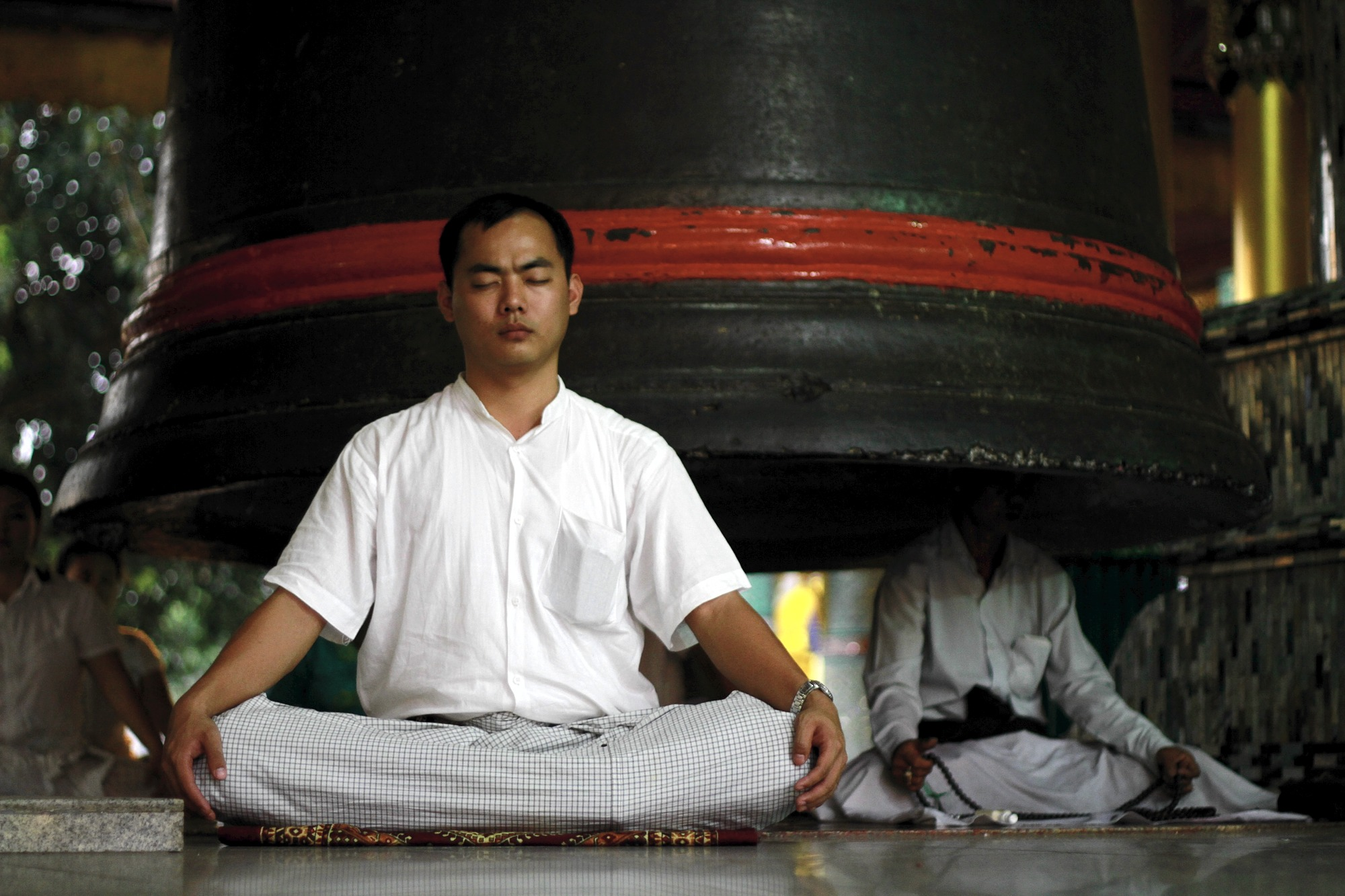
A layman meditates in front of a giant bell, at Shwedagon Pagoda in Yangon, 2012

Buddhist meditation is a popular and widespread Buddhist practice in Burma. It is done by both laypersons and monastics. Though traditionally, most laypersons (and even most monks) did not focus on meditation, this changed with the growth of a mass lay meditation movement (a.k.a. the "vipassana movement") in the 20th century. It was led by figures such as Mahasi Sayadaw, U Nu and U Ba Khin, who promoted the idea that even laypersons could strive for awakening through meditation practice.

There are numerous meditation centers throughout Burma, such as the Mahasi Thathana Yeiktha (one of the largest ones). Another important early meditation center is the International Meditation Centre (I.M.C.) of U Ba Khin. Laypersons will sometimes enter meditation retreats at these centers during which they will follow a rigorous schedule of daily meditation.

=== Shinbyu (ရှင်ပြု) ===
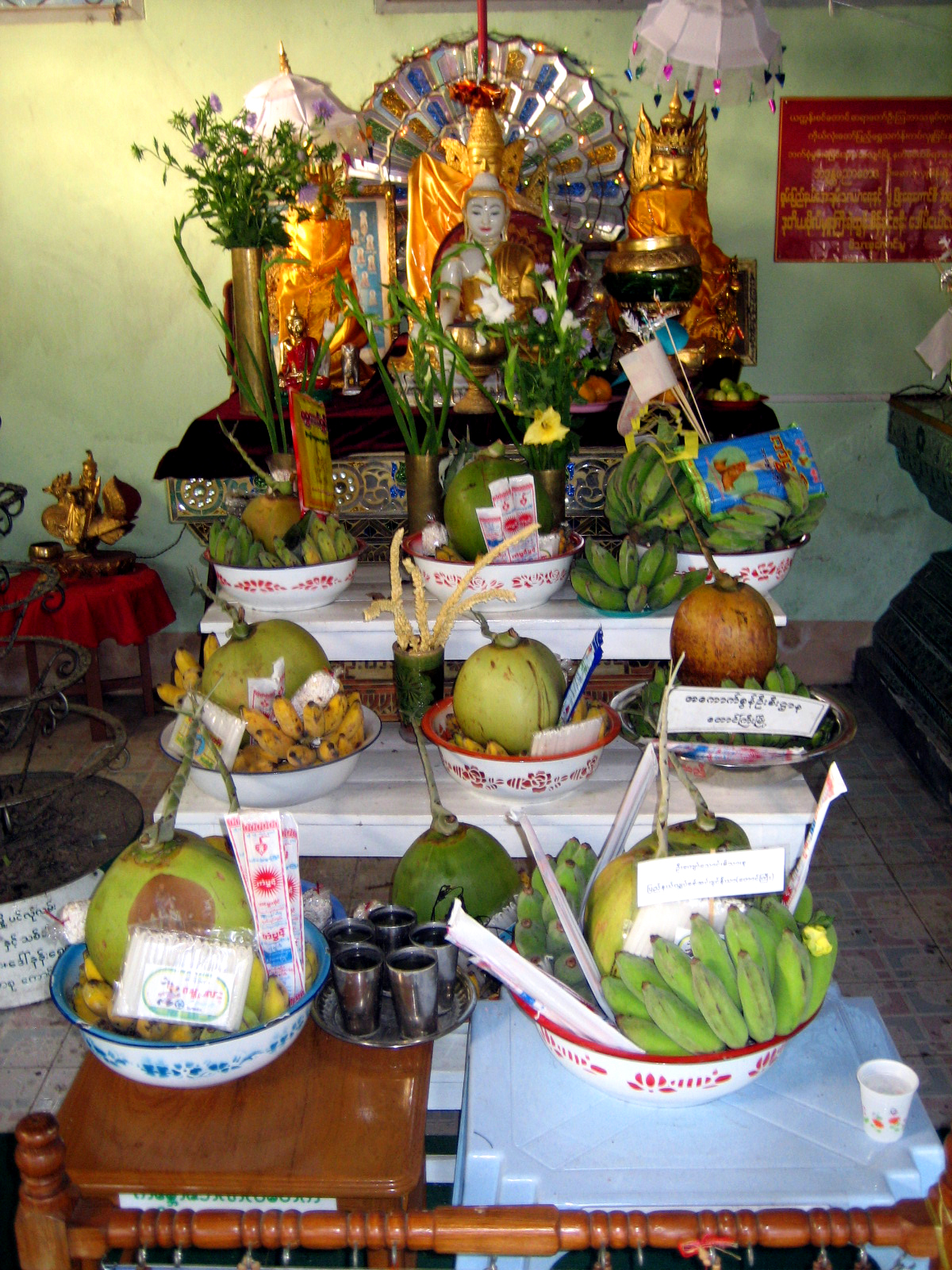
A traditional Buddhist altar at a kyaung in Taunggyi, Shan State

It is the most important duty of all Burmese parents to make sure their sons are admitted to the Buddhist Sangha by performing a shinbyu ceremony once they have reached the age of seven or older. Shinbyu is considered one of the Twelve Auspicious Rites in Burmese culture. This symbolic procession and ceremony of exchanging princely attire with that of an ascetic follows the example of Gautama Buddha. He was born a royal prince named Siddartha Gautama, but left his palace on horseback followed by his loyal attendant Chanda (မောင်ဆန်း) after he found out that life is made up of suffering (dukkha) and the notion of self is merely an illusion (anatta) when one day he saw the "Four Great Signs" (နမိတ်ကြီးလေးပါး) – the old, the sick, the dead, and the ascetic – in the royal gardens.

All Buddhists are required to keep the basic Five Precepts (ငါးပါးသီလ), and novices are expected to keep the Ten Precepts (ဆယ်ပါးသီလ). Parents expect them to stay at the kyaung immersed in the teachings of the Buddha as members of the Sangha for three months or longer. They will have another opportunity to join the Sangha at the age of 20, taking the upasampada ordination, to become a fully ordained bhikkhu, keeping the 227 precepts of the full monastic rules or Pātimokkha and perhaps remain a monk for life.

=== Vassa ===
The three monsoon months from mid-July to mid-October is Vassa (ဝါတွင်း, Burmese pronunciation: [wàdwɪ́ɰ̃]), a time when people are busy tilling their land and planting the rice paddies and bhikkhus remain in kyaungs. New robes are offered to bhikkhus at the beginning of Vassa, the end of which is marked by the Thadingyut Festival.

After the harvest, robes are again offered at Kathina (Burmese pronunciation: [kətʰèɪɰ̃]), usually held during October or November. Uposatha days are observed by keeping the Eight Precepts by laypersons during Thingyan and Vassa and by devout Buddhists all year round.

Parents and elders also receive obeisance from younger members of the family at the beginning as well as the end of Lent, after the tradition established by the Buddha himself. It was during Vassa that he ascended to the Tāvatiṃsa Heaven to preach a sermon, as an act of gratitude, to his mother, who had become a deva, and he was welcomed back to earth with a great festival of lights. Teachers receive the same obeisance, a tradition started by National Schools founded in defiance of the colonial administration and continued after independence by state schools.

Wedding ceremonies – nothing to do with religion and not conducted by the Sangha – are not held during the three months of Vassa, a custom which has resulted in a spate of weddings after Thadingyut or Wa-kyut, awaited impatiently by couples wanting to tie the knot.

=== Buddhist education ===
Devout Burmese Buddhists may send their children to local monasteries (kyaungs) to receive a Buddhist education, which, apart from learning the three Rs, also includes learning the Pāli Canon, the life story of Gautama Buddha, the 550 Jataka tales – most importantly the 38 Buddhist Beatitudes.

Monks were the traditional teachers of the young and old alike until secular and missionary schools came into being during the British colonial administration. There has been a revival of monastic schools since the 1990s with the deepening economic crisis. Children from poor families that can ill afford fees, uniforms and books have renewed the demand for a free monastic education, and minority groups such as the Shan, Pa'O, Palaung, Lahu and Wa are benefitting from this revival.

== Monasticism ==
Ordained Buddhist monks by monastic order in Myanmar (2016).
1. Thudhamma 467,025 (87.3%)
2. Shwegyin 50,692 (9.47%)
3. Mahādvāra 6,066 (1.13%)
4. Mūladvāra 3,872 (0.72%)
5. Veḷuvan 3,732 (0.70%)
6. Hngettwin 1,445 (0.27%)
7. Kudo 927 (0.17%)
8. Mahāyin 823 (0.15%)
9. Anaukchaung 645 (0.12%)

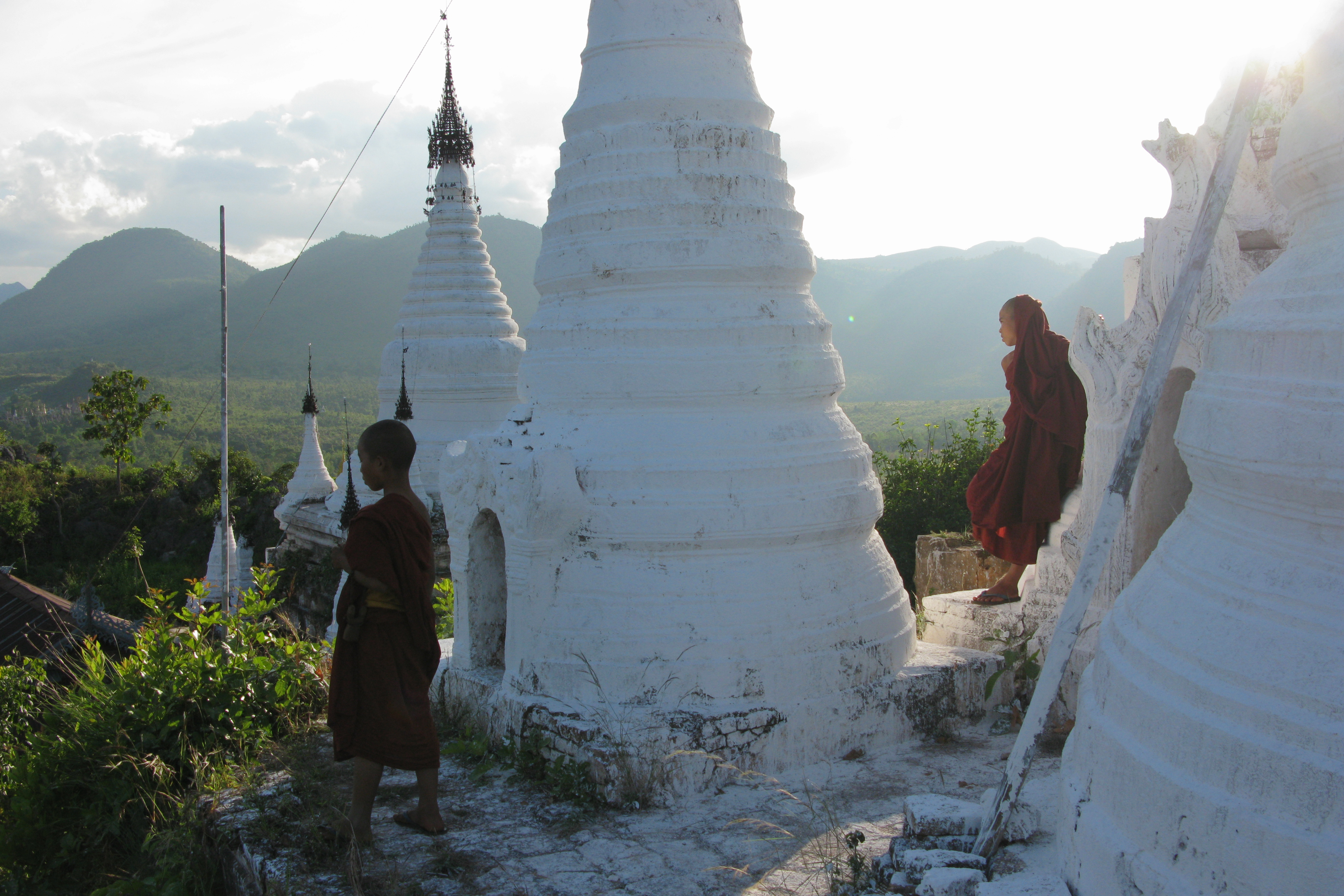
Young monks near Indein, Shan State

Buddhist monks are venerated throughout Burmese society. According to 2016 statistics published by the State Sangha Maha Nayaka Committee, the Sangha included 535,327 members, evenly split between 282,347 fully-ordained Buddhist monks (bhikku) and 252,962 novice monks (samanera). There were also 60,390 thilashin nuns.

The majority of Buddhist monks belong to one of two primary monastic orders (ဂိုဏ်း gaing, from Pali ဂဏ gaṇa): Thudhamma Gaing (87.24% of Buddhist monks) and the more orthodox Shwegyin Gaing (9.47% of Buddhist monks). Other minor monastic orders include Kudo Gaing, Mahāyin Gaing, Veḷuvan Gaing, Anaukchaung Dvāra Gaing, Mahā Dvāra Gaing and Mūla Dvāra Gaing in Lower Burma, and Hngettwin Gaing in Mandalay, each having a few thousand member monks. There are nine legally recognised monastic orders in Burma today, under the 1990 Law Concerning Sangha Organizations. Burmese monastic orders do not differ in doctrine but in monastic practice, lineage and organisational structure.

There are also numerous small esoteric Buddhist sects or weizza not recognised by any authority that incorporate non-Buddhist elements like alchemy, magic and occultism.

The overwhelming majority of Burmese monks wear maroon robes, while others wear ochre, unlike in neighbouring Theravada countries like Thailand, Laos and Sri Lanka, where monks commonly wear saffron robes.

=== Female monastics ===
The full bhikkhuni (nuns) lineage of Theravada Buddhism died out, and for various technical and social reasons was therefore permanently absent. The governing council of Buddhism in Myanmar has ruled that there can be no valid ordination of women in modern times, though some Burmese monks disagree. However, as in many other Theravadin countries, women have created a niche for themselves as renunciants not recognised by the state-empowered Sangharaja or even the Sangha in general. In Myanmar, these women are called thilashin.

A thilashin (Burmese: သီလရှင်, pronounced [θìla̰ʃɪ̀ɰ̃], "possessor of morality", from Pali sīla) is a female lay renunciant whose vows are the same as those of sāmaṇerīs "novitiate nuns". Like the maechi of neighbouring Thailand and the dasa sil mata of Sri Lanka, thilashin occupy a position somewhere between that of an ordinary lay follower and an ordained monastic. However, they are treated more favourably than most maechi, being able to receive training, practice meditation and sit for the same qualification examinations as the monks.

Thilashins observe the ten precepts and can be recognised by their pink robes, shaven head, orange or brown shawl and metal alms bowl. Thilashins go out on alms rounds on uposatha and receive uncooked rice or money. Thilashins are addressed with the honorifics sayale (Burmese: ဆရာလေး, [sʰəjàlé] "little teacher") and daw (ဒေါ်, [dɔ̀]).

Thilashins often reside in either separate quarters or in segregated kyaung (temple-monasteries). They do not have to look after the monks, but may help cook if required. Although ranked lower than the monks, they are not subservient to them.

There have been efforts by some thilashins to reinstate the bhikkhuni lineage, although there are reservations from the government and general populace. A new Theravada bhikkhuni sangha was first convened in 1996, and since then many more have taken the full vows. However, within Myanmar, thilashins remain the only monastic option for women at this time. In 2003, Saccavadi and Gunasari were ordained as bhikkhunis in Sri Lanka, thus becoming the first female Myanma novices in modern times to receive higher ordination in Sri Lanka.

== Politics ==
Buddhism made major contributions in the development of Burmese politics. Buddhist monks and lay organizations remain involved in Burmese politics. Burmese nationalism first began with the formation of the Young Men's Buddhist Association (YMBA) in 1906. Buddhist monks along with students have been in the forefront of the struggle for independence and later for democracy. Some influential leaders include U Ottama and U Seinda in Rakhine State, and U Wisara who died after a protracted hunger strike in Yangon prison.

Buddhist Monks often participate in political protests and may also boycott certain political figures by refusing to accept alms offerings from them (thus denying them a chance to make merit). Since independence, the Government and individual government figures have patronised Buddhism through different forms of donations as a way to legitimise their rule. Thus, this form of boycott is a powerful tool of protest in Myanmar.

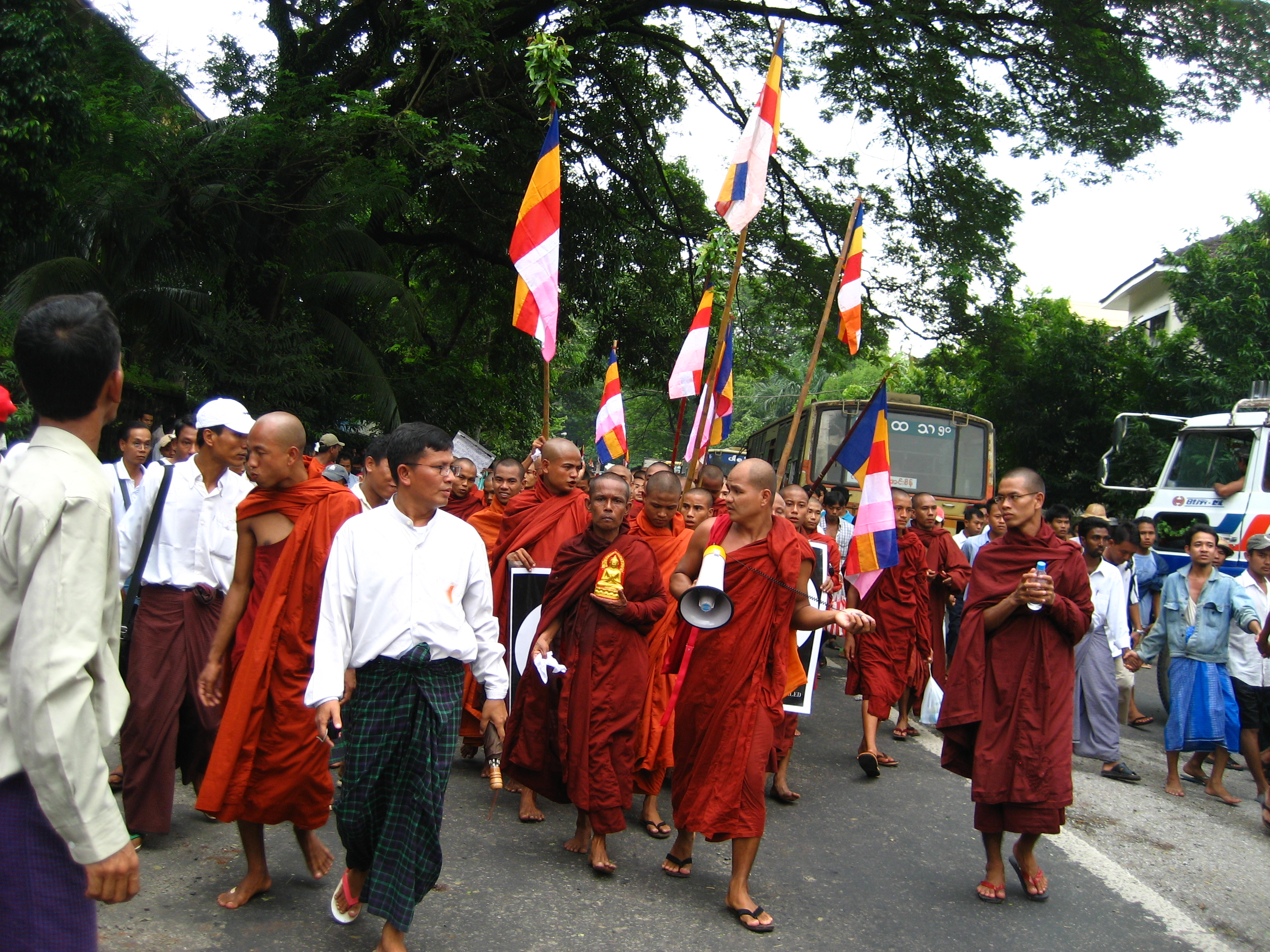
Buddhist monks were at the forefront of the so-called Saffron Revolution in 2007, in protest of living and economic conditions in the country

The Shwedagon Pagoda has been an important venue for large public meetings where both Aung San and his daughter Aung San Suu Kyi made their famous speeches. During the second university strike of 1936, students camped out on the Shwedagon terraces. Pro-democracy leaders, especially Suu Kyi, have consistently appealed to Buddhist values in their struggle for democracy.

One of the most recent waves of protests in which Buddhist monks participated in large numbers was the Saffron Revolution of 2007. The military junta cracked down harshly and imprisoned thousands of monks, while leaving many others dead.

In November 2008, U Gambira, a leader of the All Burma Monks' Alliance, was sentenced to 68 years in prison, at least 12 years of which will be hard labour; other charges against him are still pending. In early 2009, his sentence was reduced to 63 years. His sentence was protested by Human Rights Watch, and Amnesty International considers him a prisoner of conscience. Both groups called for his immediate release. Gambira was released during a mass pardon of prisoners on 13 January 2012 as part of the 2011–2012 Burmese political reforms. He ceased to be a monk in April 2012, stating that he had been unable to find a monastery to join due to his status as a former prisoner. He was re-arrested at least three times in 2012, and as of 11 December 2012, was released on bail.

== Demographics ==
Historical population (Census)
Year	Pop.	±%
1891	6,888,075	—
1901	9,184,121	+33.3%
1911	10,384,379	+13.1%
1921	11,201,943	+7.9%
1931	12,348,037	+10.2%
1973	17,764,008	+43.9%
1983	30,520,175	+71.8%
2014	45,185,449	+48.1%
Source: 2014 Myanmar Census Report: Religion (Vol. 2-C)

Buddhism is practiced by approximately 90% of the country. According to Burmese census data dating back to 1891, between 84% and 90% of the population have practiced Buddhism.

== State Religion Day ==
Although Buddhism has not been the official state religion of Myanmar since the 1962 military coup, Buddhist nationalists mark the Full Moon Day of Wagaung as "State Religion Day" (နိုင်ငံတော်ဘာသာနေ့), as commemoration of the enactments of the "1961 Act of the Third Amendment of the Constitution" on the Full Moon Day of Wagaung of 1323 ME (26 August 1961 CE). In 2015, The Association for Protection of Race and Religion (Ma Ba Tha) requested the government to officially celebrate the State Religion Day.

Recent celebration is the 60th anniversary of the State Religion Day on 26 August 2021, led by the Young Men's Buddhist Association (YMBA), and include the hoisting of Sasana flags in homes and posting the flag photos on social media. On 22 August 2021, Kayin State Government led by Chief Minister U Saw Myint Oo attended one of the meriting ceremonies commemorating the 60th anniversary of the State Religion Day. The observance is symbolic, commemorating the 1961 establishment of Buddhism as the state religion, although Myanmar has not had an official state religion since the 1962 military coup, and the current 2008 Constitution recognizes only the "special position" of Theravada Buddhism.

== See also ==
- Agga Maha Pandita
- Burmese Buddhist titles
- Buddhist sects in Myanmar
- Burmese pagoda
- State Sangha Maha Nayaka Committee
- List of Sāsana Azani recipients
- Tipitakadhara Tipitakakovida Selection Examinations
- Vipassana Movement
- Buddha Sāsana Nuggaha
- Young Men's Buddhist Association (Burma)
- Dhammasattha
- Satuditha
- Shwedagon Pagoda
- Thadingyut Festival
- Pagoda festival
- 969 Movement
