= Vimala =

Vimala may refer to:

== People ==
- U Vimala (1899–1962), Burmese Buddhist monk
- Vimalakka (born 1964), Indian balladeer
- Vimala Devi (born 1932), Indian writer
- Vimala Raman, Indian dancer
- Vimala Rangachar (1929–2025), Indian educationist and cultural activist
- Vimala Thakar (1921–2009), Indian social activist

== Other uses ==
- Vimalakirti, a Buddhist figure in ancient India
- Vimalanatha, 13th Jain Tirthankara
- Vimala College, a Christian college in Thrissur, India
- Vimala's Curryblossom Cafe, Indian restaurant in North Carolina, United States
- Vimala Temple, Hindu temple in Orissa, India
- Vimala Nagar, Wayanad, a village in Kerala, India
- Vimala (film), a 1960 Indian Telugu-language film

== See also ==
- Vimal (disambiguation), masculine form of the name
