= Mental noting =

Mental noting is a mindfulness meditation technique which aims to label experiences as they arise. In practice, this means using a single word to describe what one is experiencing in the current moment, for example "warmth", "excitement", "resisting", etc. These experiences can be sensory, emotional, or cognitive.

Mental noting has several different functions, including grounding the meditator in the present moment, increasing overall awareness, help recognise patterns of experience, and lessening identification with experiences.

Noting practice is common in Burmese Buddhism. It is part of Vipassanā.

== See also ==
- Introspection
- Metacognition
- Self-awareness
