= Bimal (name) =

Bimal is an Indian or Nepalese given name, mostly masculine. Notable people of this name include:

- Bimal Kumar Bachhawat (1925–1996), Indian neurochemist and glycobiologist
- Bimal Bora, Assamese politician
- Bimal Bose (Bimal Krishna Bose; 1918–1996), Indian cricketer
- Bimal Kumar Bose (born 1932), Indian electrical engineer and academic in the field of artificial intelligence
- Bimal Chandra (1925–before 2003), Indian Olympic swimmer
- Bimal Gharti Magar (born 1998), Nepalese footballer
- Bimal Ghosh (born 1956), Indian footballer
- Bimal Guha (born 1952), Bangladeshi poet
- Bimal Gurung (born 1964), Indian Gurkha politician and wanted criminal.
- Bimal Jadeja (born 1962), Indian cricketer
- Bimal Jalan (born 1941), Indian financial expert, Governor of Reserve Bank of India 2000–2004
- Bimal Jayakody, Sri Lankan actor
- Bimal Kaur Khalsa (Bibi Bimal Kaur; died 1990), Indian female politician; wife of Beant Singh, one of the assassins of Indira Gandhi
- Bimal Lakra (born 1980), Indian hockey player
- Bimal Magar (born 1989), Nepalese footballer
- Bimal Krishna Matilal (1935–1991), Indian philosopher, Spalding Professor (University of Oxford) 1977–1991
- Bimal Mitra (1912–1991), Bengali writer
- Bimal Mitra (cricketer) (1914–nk), Bengali cricketer
- Bimal Mukherjee (1903–1996), Indian traveller and bicyclist
- Bimal Patel (born 1961), Indian architect, academic and town planner
- Bimal N. Patel, Indian Professor of Law and Member of Law Commission
- Bimal Prasad (1923–2015), Indian historian
- Bimal Rathnayake, Sri Lankan politician
- Bimal Roy (1909–1965), Indian film director
  - Bimal Roy Memorial Trophy
- Bimal Kumar Roy, Indian statistician and cryptologist
- Bimal Soni, Indian cricket manager
- Bimal Tarafdar (born 1974), Bangladeshi sprinter

== See also ==
- Bimaal
- Bīmāl Revolt
- Vimala Temple, dedicated to the goddess Bimala or Vimala
