= Vimal (name) =

Vimal may refer to the following people

Given name

- Vimal (actor) (born 1979), Indian Tamil film actor.
- Vimal Kumar Chordia (1924–c. 2019), Indian politician
- Vimal Mundada (c. 1963–2012), Indian politician
- Vimal Shah (born 1953), Kenyan businessman, entrepreneur and industrialist

Surname

- Ganga Prasad Vimal (1940–2019), Indian writer
- Nikhila Vimal (born 1994), Indian actress
- R. S. Vimal, Indian filmmaker
- U. Vimal Kumar (born 1962), Indian badminton player

== See also ==
- Wimal
