= U Vimala =

Mogok Sayadaw U Vimala
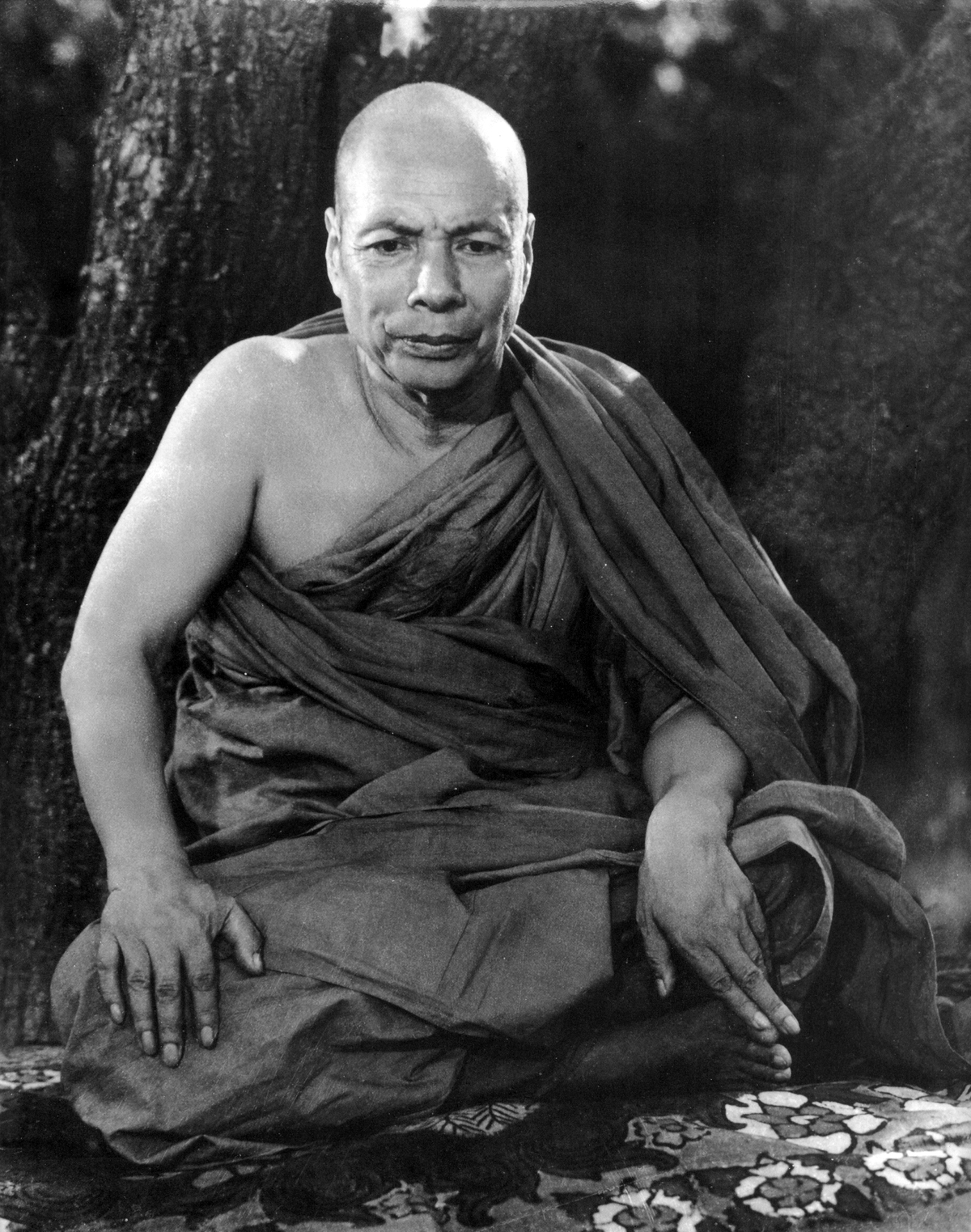
- Title: Agga Maha Pandita

Personal life
- Born: Maung Hla Baw; 27 December 1899 Uyindaw Village, Mandalay Province, Burma
- Died: 17 October 1962 (aged 62) Amarapura, Mandalay Division, Burma
- Occupation: Bhikkhu

Religious life
- Religion: Buddhism
- School: Theravada
- Dharma name: Vimala ဝိမလ

Senior posting
- Based in: Mogok Monastery, Amarapura, Burma

U Vimala (Burmese: ဦးဝိမလ; 27 December 1899 – 17 October 1962), commonly known as the Mogok Sayadaw (Burmese: မိုးကုတ်ဆရာတော်), was a renowned bhikkhu and vipassanā meditation master of Theravada Buddhism.

== Early life ==
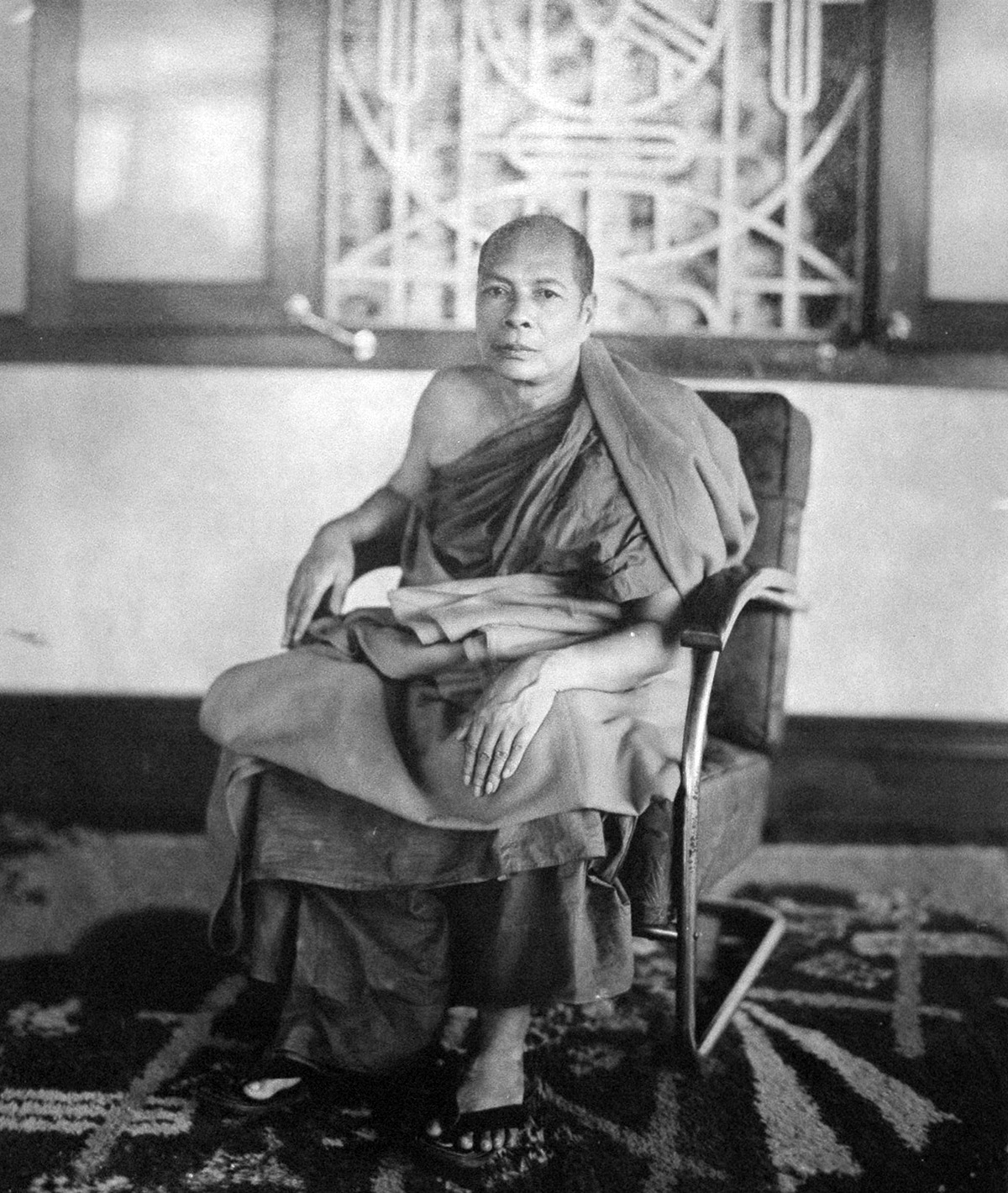
Mogok Sayadaw seated.

He was born Maung Hla Baw to Daw Shwe Ake and U Aung Tun in a small village close to Amarapura in Mandalay Province, Burma on 27 December 1899. Hla Baw began his education at 4, and enrolled as a samanera or novitiate at age 9 under U Jagara. He later left for Mingala Makuna Monastery at Amarapura to continue his religious studies.

== Monkhood ==
In 1920, he was ordained as a bhikkhu (monk) in the tradition of Burmese Buddhism with the dharma name Vimala (ဝိမလ) which means "stainless, Undefiled." As his monkhood was sponsored by the residents of Mogok, a town well known for rubies and gems, Vimala became known as "Mogok". In 1924, Vimala became the chief abbot of Pikara Monastery. He began to give sermons focusing on abhidhamma and teaching vipassana meditation. He attained Nirvana by practicing meditation for four years and became an Arahant. Then, he disseminated his method to the pupils for attaining Nirvana. He focused on the insight learning of the dynamic nature of mind and materials in his teaching. His teaching audio recordings are still available and learnt by Myanmar Buddhists to learn meditation methods.

== Legacy ==
U Vimala established the Mogok tradition of vipassana meditation, which is independent of the meditation traditions established by his Burmese predecessors, Ledi Sayadaw and Mahasi Sayadaw. U Vimala stressed dependent origination and cittanupassana as part of meditation practice. There are currently over 300 meditation centers in Burma that teach his form of meditation.

== See also ==
- Buddhism
- Theravada
- Vipassanā
