= Bimal Soni =

Indian cricket manager

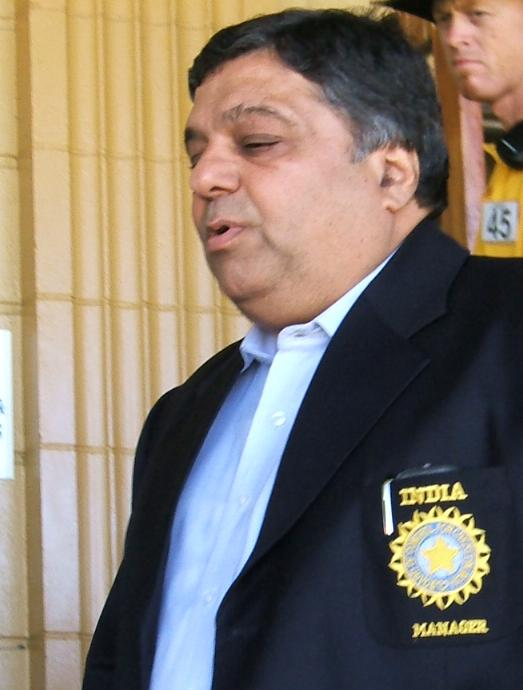
Bimal Soni

Bimal Soni was the manager of the Indian cricket team. He was also President of the Jaipur District Cricket Association, a constituent group of the Rajasthan Cricket Association.
