= All Burma Monks' Alliance =

Coalition of monks

All Burma Monks' Alliance (abbreviated ABMA) is a coalition of monks in Myanmar, representing the All Burma Young Monks' Union, the Federation of all Burma Monks' Union, the Rangoon Young Monks' Union and the Sangha Duta Council of Burma. It was founded on 9 September 2007, at the start of the Saffron Revolution, after monks were brutalized at protests in Sittwe and Pakokku. ABMA made several key demands to the ruling State Peace and Development Council (SPDC), including a formal apology to the Sangha, a reduction on fuel and commodity prices, release of political prisoners including Aung San Suu Kyi, and dialogue with pro-democracy leaders for national reconciliation. On September 21 it escalated its demands, promising to "banish the common enemy evil regime from Burmese soil forever", which was met with a violent crackdown. Leaders such as U Gambira were imprisoned and tortured, while others became refugees or went into hiding.

Outside of Myanmar, the ABMA supports refugee monks who fled retribution from the Burmese junta. 38 of these monks were relocated to the United States, but by 2010, all but eight had ceased to be practicing monks. In 2016 the executive-director-in-exile of the ABMA was U Pyinya Zawta, who lived in Buffalo, New York at the time.

== See also ==
- Burma VJ, a documentary featuring monks of the ABMA.
