= Bimal Jadeja =

Indian cricketer

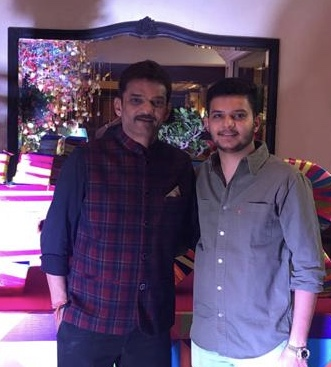

Personal information
- Full name: Bimal Mulubha Jadeja
- Born: 22 August 1964 (age 62); Ribda, India
- Nickname: Bapu
- Batting: Left-handed
- Bowling: Leg break
- Role: Batsman
- Relatives: Mulubha Jadeja (father) . Shashirajsinh B Jadeja (Son)

Domestic team information
- Years: Team
- 1980/81–1999/2000: Saurashtra

Career statistics
Competition	FC	List A
Matches	81	18
Runs scored	4,822	598
Batting average	41.56	42.71
100s/50s	14/20	1/4
Top score	203	104
Balls bowled	400	6
Wickets	3	0
Bowling average	92.66	–
5 wickets in innings	0	–
10 wickets in match	0	n/a
Best bowling	2/30	–
Catches/stumpings	50/–	8/–
- Source: ESPNcricinfo, 7 March 2016

Bimal Mulubha Jadeja (born 22 August 1964) is an Indian former first-class cricketer and Former Captain of Saurashtra cricket team. He became a cricket coach after his playing career.

== Career ==
A left-handed batsman and occasional leg break bowler, Jadeja played first-class cricket for Saurashtra and West Zone. He appeared in a total of 81 first-class and 18 List A matches in his career that lasted between 1980/81 and 1999/00 seasons. He made more than 4800 runs at an average of over 41, along with 14 centuries, in first-class cricket. He also captained the Saurashtra team during his career.

Jadeja worked as a cricket coach after retirement. After having coached the Gujarat team in Ranji Trophy, he was appointed as the coach of the Central Board of Cricket Ahmedabad in 2014.

== Personal life ==
Jadeja's father Mulubha Jadeja had played first-class cricket for Saurashtra and Railways as a right-handed batsman between 1945/46 and 1964/65.He has one son named Bimal Jadeja who is former Ranji player and Coach. Jadeja is also a distant relative of Ranjitsinhji (Jamranjitsinhji) who played Test cricket for England.
