= Sunlun Sayadaw =

Burmese Sayadaw and vipassanā meditation master of Theravada Buddhism

Sunlun Sayadaw U Kavi
- စွန်းလွန်းဆရာတော်ဘုရားကြီး
- Title: Sayadaw

Personal life
- Born: Maung Kyaw Din; 4 March 1878 Myingyan District, Mandalay Division, British Burma
- Died: 17 May 1952 (aged 74) Yangon, Yangon Division, Myanmar
- Occupation: Buddhist monk

Religious life
- Religion: Buddhism
- School: Theravada

Senior posting
- Based in: Mandalay, Burma

Sun Lun Sayadaw Pagoda Gyi (စွန်းလွန်းဆရာတော်ဘုရားကြီး); (born Maung Kyaw Din), was a prominent Burmese monk and meditation master. He was born 2nd waxing day of Tabaung 1239 M.E., (1878), Upper Burma, in Sun Lun village near Myingyan, to U Thant and Daw Tok. Because of remarkable signs at birth, he was named Maung Kyaw Din.

== Early life ==
As a boy, Maung Kyaw Din was entrusted to the Myingyan Min Kyaw Sayadaw to study literature. However, due to his temperament, he did not excel in reading and writing. At age 15, he began work at the Myingyan administrative office. In adulthood, he married Ma Shwe Yi from the same village. They had five children, four of whom died young, leaving only one son.

At the age of 30, he left his job and earned his living farming his parents’ land.

== Spiritual awakening ==
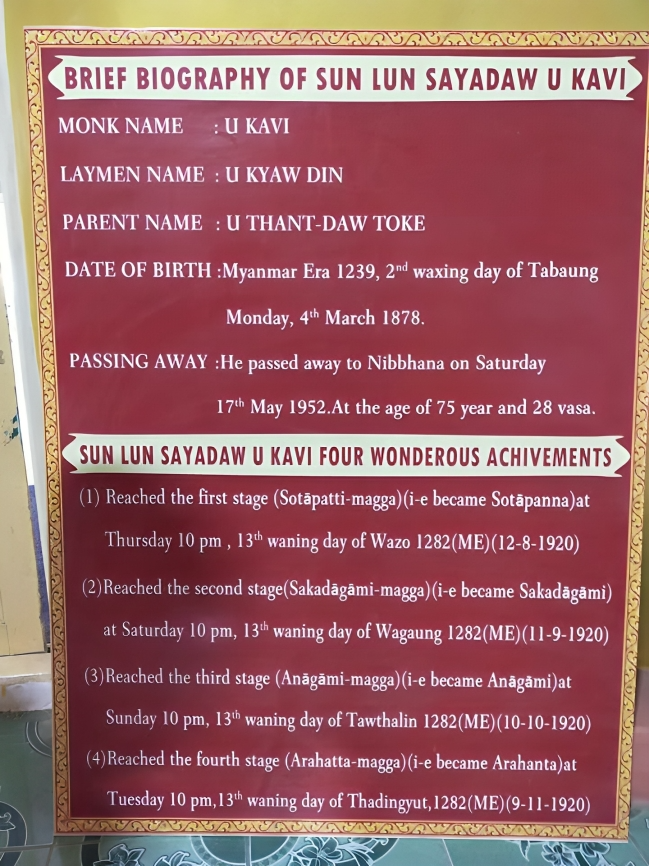
Biography of Sayadaw Kyaw Din in his burial temple in Myingyan.

Although U Kyaw Din did not study the scriptures in depth, in the month of Tabaung 1281 ME (1919 CE), he began to seek the Dhamma. He practiced meditation on breathing — inhalation, exhalation, awareness of touch, and mindfulness — with strong faith, diligence, and perseverance, day and night without interruption.

- On the 13th waxing day of Waso 1282 ME, Thursday at 10 p.m., he experienced the first stage of higher Dhamma insight.
- On the 13th waxing day of Wagaung 1282 ME, Saturday at 10 p.m., he experienced the second stage.
- On the 13th waxing day of Tawthalin 1282 ME, Monday at 10 p.m., after enduring intense bodily pain, he experienced the third stage.
- On the 13th waxing day of Thadingyut 1282 ME, Tuesday at 10 p.m., he reached the fourth stage of insight.

== Ordination ==
On the 5th waxing day of Thadingyut 1282 ME, after freeing a cow from his field, U Kyaw Din went to U Kyauk Kyaung Monastery in Sun Lun village and became a novice. On the 12th waxing day of Tabodwe 1282 ME, at 4:09 p.m., he was fully ordained as a monk at Yele Monastery, Khanthatheinpa, Meiktila. He was given the monastic name Shin Kavi.

During his monkhood, he resided south of Sun Lun village and continued his meditation practice, attaining the fourth stage of insight again as a monk.

== Teaching ==
As Sun Lun Sayadaw U Kavi, he taught Samatha, Vipassana, and Paṭṭhāna meditation to monks, nuns, and laypeople who came to seek guidance. He was known for offering the "cool water of the Dhamma" and "nectar of the teachings" to his disciples.

== Passing ==
He died on the 9th waxing day of Kason 1314 ME (1952 CE).

His body, enshrined in Sun Lun Cave Monastery in Myingyan, remains intact without decay decades after his death.

== See also ==
Thae Inn Gu Sayadaw
