= Thamanya Sayadaw =

- သာမညဆရာတော်
- Title: Abhidhaja Agga Maha Saddhamma Jotika Badanta Vinaya

Personal life
- Born: Maung; 1910 Kawkyaik village, Hpa-an Township, British Burma
- Died: 29 November 2003 (aged 92–93)
- Occupation: Buddhist monk

Religious life
- Religion: Buddhism
- Temple: Thamanya Hill near Hpa-an, Kayin State
- School: Theravada
- Dharma names: Vinaya (ဝိနယ)

Thamanya Sayadaw U Vinaya (Burmese: သာမညဆရာတော် ဦးဝိနယ) was a prominent and influential Burmese Buddhist monk of Pa-O descent, best known for his doctrinal emphasis on metta.

He was first ordained as a novice at the age of 13 and received higher ordination on 3 June 1932 at the age of 20. He established a monastery and meditation retreat near his hometown, on Thamanya Hill, where he taught meditation and discourses. The area around his monastery was declared a sanctuary (ဘေးမဲ့ဒေသ) where nonviolence and vegetarianism were practiced. By the mid-1980s, followers established a thriving community around Thamanya Hill, comprising 5,000 households in the late 1990s, as the Sayadaw doled out free land tracts around his monastery.

In 1991, the Burmese government conferred on him the title "Abhidhaja Agga Maha Saddhamma Jotika" for his charity and missionary works. He was known for his education and infrastructure projects, including the construction of the Thanlwin Bridge, a road that connects Myawaddy to Mae Sot and his sponsorship of local schools. However, he publicly criticized the ruling State Law and Order Restoration Council, refused its patronage and invitations to visit Yangon, while he publicly expressed support for Aung San Suu Kyi.

He died on 29 November 2003 and had suffered from diabetes and heart problems. On 2 April 2008, his corpse was mysteriously removed from its tomb. Four days later, the unknown perpetrators notified monks that the corpse had been burnt, and was found at the site of a small stupa in Kawkada village. This act was widely considered a yadaya ritual.
