= Wimal =

Wimal is a Sri Lankan masculine given name. Notable people with the name include:

- Wimal Kumara de Costa (1948–2016), Sri Lankan actor
- Wimal Weerawansa (born 1965), Sri Lankan politician
- Wimal Wickremasinghe (1942–2009), Sri Lankan politician and economist
