= Outline of Myanmar =

Country in Southeast Asia

The Flag of Myanmar

The Coat of arms of Myanmar

The location of Myanmar

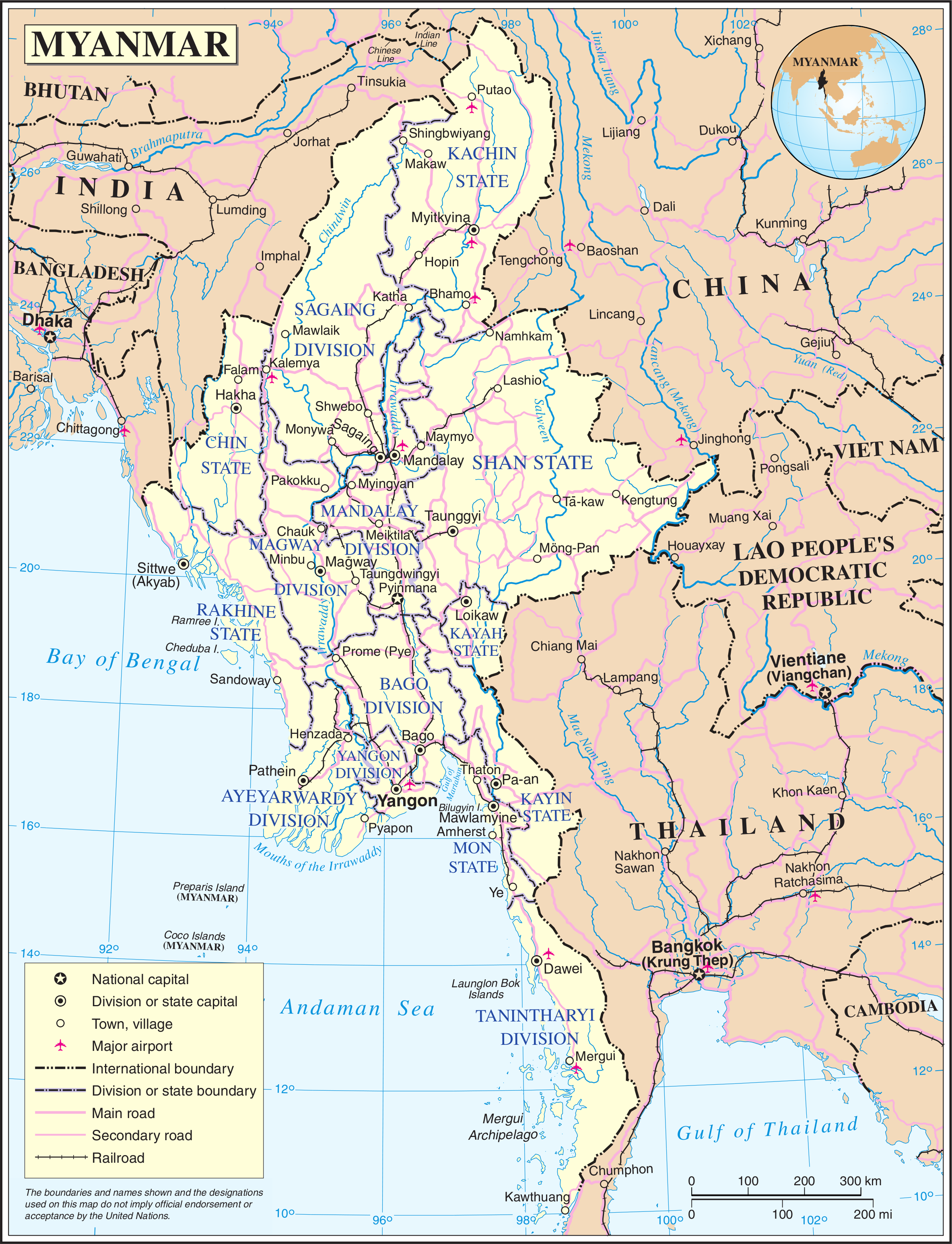
An enlargeable map of Myanmar

The following outline is provided as an overview of and topical guide to Myanmar:

Myanmar, also known as Burma, is the most extensive country in mainland Southeast Asia. The country is bordered by the People's Republic of China on the northeast, Laos on the east, Thailand on the southeast, Bangladesh on the west, and India on the northwest, with the Bay of Bengal to the southwest. One-third of Burma's total perimeter, 1,930 kilometers (1,199 mi), forms an uninterrupted coastline. The country's culture, heavily influenced by neighbours, is based on Theravada Buddhism intertwined with local elements.

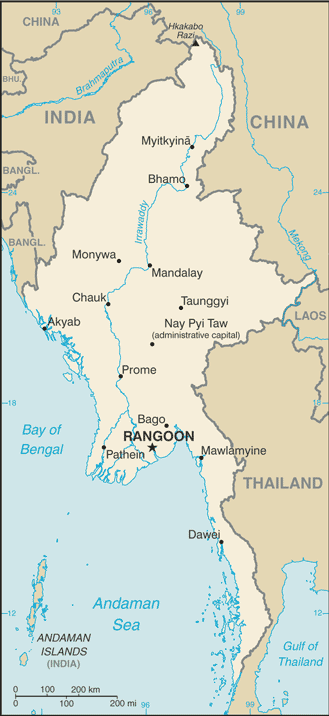
An enlargeable basic map of Myanmar

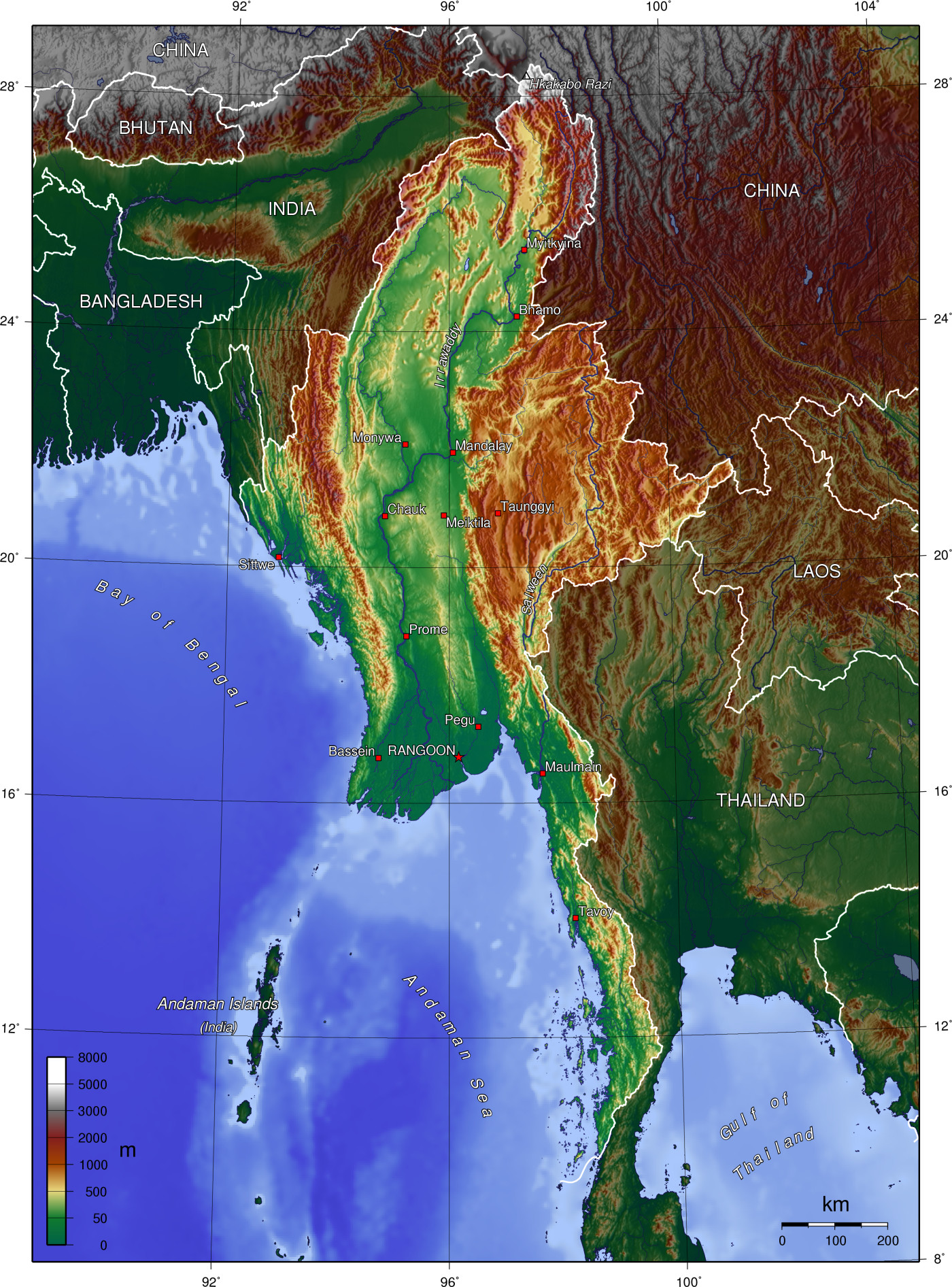
An enlargeable topographic map of Myanmar

== General reference ==
- Pronunciation: /ˈbɜːrmə/ or /ˌmjɑːnˈmɑːr/
- Common English country names: Myanmar or Burma
- Official English country name: The Republic of the Union of Myanmar
- Common endonym(s):
- Official endonym(s):
- Adjectival(s): Burmese or Myanma
- Demonym(s):
- Etymology: Name of Myanmar
- International rankings of Myanmar
- ISO country codes: MM, MMR, 104
- ISO region codes: See ISO 3166-2:MM
- Internet country code top-level domain: .mm

== Geography of Myanmar ==
Geography of Myanmar

- Myanmar is: a country
- Location:
  - Northern Hemisphere and Eastern Hemisphere
  - Eurasia
    - Asia
      - South East Asia
        - Indochina
  - Time zone: Myanmar Standard Time (UTC+06:30)
  - Extreme points of Myanmar
    - High: Hkakabo Razi 5,881 m (19,295 ft)
    - Low: Indian Ocean 0 m
    - North: Hkakabo Razi 28°19′59″N
    - South: Islands at Kawthaung 9°50′00″N
    - East: Somewhere in Eastern Shan State Special Region 4 but not in Mong La Township 101°10'10.2"E
    - West: Northwest of Sittwe 92°10′00″E
  - Land boundaries: 5,876 km (3,651 mi)

China 2,185 km (1,358 mi)
Thailand 1,800 km (1,100 mi)
India 1,463 km (909 mi)
Laos 235 km (146 mi)
Bangladesh 193 km (120 mi)

- Coastline: Indian Ocean 1,930 km (1,200 mi)

- Population of Myanmar: 55,390,000 (2006) – 26th most populous country
- Area of Myanmar: 676,578 square kilometres (261,228 sq mi) – 40th largest country
- Atlas of Myanmar

=== Environment of Myanmar ===
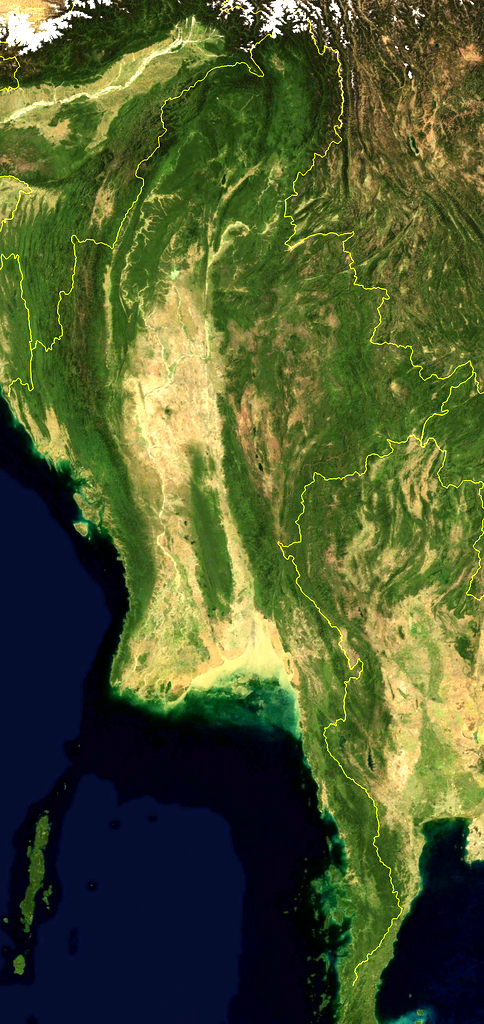
An enlargeable satellite image of Myanmar

- Climate of Myanmar
- Ecoregions in Myanmar
- Protected areas of Myanmar
  - National parks of Myanmar
- Wildlife of Myanmar
  - Fauna of Myanmar
    - Birds of Myanmar
    - Mammals of Myanmar

==== Natural geographic features of Myanmar ====
- Islands of Myanmar
- Mountains of Myanmar
  - Volcanoes in Myanmar
- Rivers of Myanmar
- World Heritage Sites in Myanmar: Pyu Ancient Cities (listed in 2014) and Bagan (listed in 2019)

=== Regions of Myanmar ===
==== Ecoregions of Myanmar ====
Ecoregions in Myanmar

==== Administrative divisions of Myanmar ====
Administrative divisions of Myanmar

===== States =====
- Chin State
- Kachin State
- Kayah State
- Kayin State
- Mon State
- Rakhine State
- Shan State

===== Regions =====
- Ayeyarwady Region
- Bago Region
- Magway Region
- Mandalay Region
- Sagaing Region
- Tanintharyi Region
- Yangon Region

===== Self-Administered Zones =====
- Danu Self-Administered Zone
- Kokang Self-Administered Zone
- Naga Self-Administered Zone
- Pa Laung Self-Administered Zone
- Pa-O Self-Administered Zone

===== Self-Administered Divisions =====
- Wa Self-Administered Division

===== Districts of Myanmar =====
Districts of Myanmar

===== Municipalities of Myanmar =====
- Capital of Myanmar: Naypyidaw
- Cities of Myanmar

=== Demography of Myanmar ===
Demographics of Myanmar

== Government and politics of Myanmar ==
Politics of Myanmar

- Form of government: unitary parliamentary republic
- Capital of Myanmar: Naypyidaw
- Elections in Myanmar
- Political parties in Myanmar

=== Branches of government ===
Government of Myanmar

==== Executive branch of the government of Myanmar ====
- Head of state: President of Myanmar, Min Aung Hlaing (Pro Tem On Duty)
  - Vice Presidents: Vacant
- Head of government: Prime Minister of Myanmar, Nyo Saw
- Military junta: State Administration Council
  - Chairman: Min Aung Hlaing
  - Vice Chairman: Soe Win
- National Defence and Security Council
- Cabinet of Myanmar
  - Provisional Government

==== Legislative branch of the government of Myanmar ====
- Assembly of the Union (Pyidaungsu Hluttaw)
  - House of Representatives (Pyithu Hluttaw)
  - House of Nationalities (Amyotha Hluttaw)
- State and Region Hluttaws

==== Judicial branch of the government of Myanmar ====
Court system of Myanmar

- Supreme Court of Myanmar

=== Foreign relations of Myanmar ===
Foreign relations of Myanmar

- Diplomatic missions in Myanmar
- Diplomatic missions of Myanmar

==== International organization membership ====
The Union of Myanmar is a member of:

- Asian Development Bank (ADB)
- Asia-Pacific Telecommunity (APT)
- Association of Southeast Asian Nations (ASEAN)
- Association of Southeast Asian Nations Regional Forum (ARF)
- Bay of Bengal Initiative for Multi-Sectoral Technical and Economic Cooperation (BIMSTEC)
- Colombo Plan (CP)
- East Asia Summit (EAS)
- Food and Agriculture Organization (FAO)
- Group of 77 (G77)
- International Atomic Energy Agency (IAEA)
- International Bank for Reconstruction and Development (IBRD)
- International Civil Aviation Organization (ICAO)
- International Criminal Police Organization (Interpol)
- International Development Association (IDA)
- International Federation of Red Cross and Red Crescent Societies (IFRCS)
- International Finance Corporation (IFC)
- International Fund for Agricultural Development (IFAD)
- International Hydrographic Organization (IHO)
- International Labour Organization (ILO)
- International Maritime Organization (IMO)
- International Monetary Fund (IMF)
- International Olympic Committee (IOC)
- International Organization for Standardization (ISO) (correspondent)
- International Red Cross and Red Crescent Movement (ICRM)
- International Telecommunication Union (ITU)
- Nonaligned Movement (NAM)
- Organisation for the Prohibition of Chemical Weapons (OPCW) (signatory)
- South Asian Association for Regional Cooperation (SAARC) (observer)
- United Nations (UN)
- United Nations Conference on Trade and Development (UNCTAD)
- United Nations Educational, Scientific, and Cultural Organization (UNESCO)
- United Nations Industrial Development Organization (UNIDO)
- Universal Postal Union (UPU)
- World Customs Organization (WCO)
- World Federation of Trade Unions (WFTU)
- World Health Organization (WHO)
- World Intellectual Property Organization (WIPO)
- World Meteorological Organization (WMO)
- World Trade Organization (WTO)

Burma is 1 of only 7 U.N. members which is not a member of the Organisation for the Prohibition of Chemical Weapons.

=== Law and order in Myanmar ===
Law of Myanmar

- Constitution of Myanmar
- Crime in Myanmar
- Human rights in Myanmar
  - LGBT rights in Myanmar
  - Women's rights in Myanmar
  - Freedom of religion in Myanmar
- Law enforcement in Myanmar

=== Military of Myanmar ===
Military of Myanmar

- Command
  - Commander-in-chief: Min Aung Hlaing
- Forces
  - Army of Myanmar
  - Navy of Myanmar
  - Air Force of Myanmar
  - Special Forces of Myanmar
- Military history of Myanmar
- Military ranks of Myanmar

=== Local government in Myanmar ===
See: Administrative divisions of Myanmar, State and Region Government of Myanmar

== History of Myanmar ==
History of Myanmar

- Timeline of Burmese history
- Prehistory of Myanmar
- Military history of Myanmar

== Culture of Myanmar ==
Culture of Myanmar

- Architecture of Myanmar
- Cuisine of Myanmar
- Irreligion in Myanmar
- Languages of Myanmar
- Media in Myanmar
- Museums in Myanmar
  - Museums in Yangon
- National symbols of Myanmar
  - Coat of arms of Myanmar
  - Flag of Myanmar
  - National anthem of Myanmar
- People of Myanmar
- Prostitution in Myanmar
- Public holidays in Myanmar
  - List of Burmese traditional festivals
  - Pagoda festival
- Religion in Myanmar
  - Buddhism in Myanmar
    - Thudhamma Nikaya
    - Shwegyin Nikaya
    - Hngettwin Nikaya
    - Mahādvāra Nikāya
    - Buddha Sāsana Nuggaha
    - State Sangha Maha Nayaka Committee
  - Burmese folk religion
  - Christianity in Myanmar
  - Hinduism in Myanmar
  - Islam in Myanmar
  - Judaism in Myanmar
- World Heritage Sites in Myanmar: None

=== Art in Myanmar ===
- Cinema of Myanmar
- Literature of Myanmar
- Music of Myanmar
- Television in Myanmar

=== Sports in Myanmar ===
Sports in Myanmar

- Football in Myanmar
- Myanmar at the Olympics

== Economy and infrastructure of Myanmar ==
Economy of Myanmar

- Economic rank, by nominal GDP (2007): 103rd (one hundred and third)
- Agriculture in Myanmar
- Communications in Myanmar
  - Internet in Myanmar
- Companies of Myanmar
- Currency of Myanmar: Kyat
  - ISO 4217: MMK
- Energy in Myanmar
- Health care in Myanmar
- Myanmar units of measurement
- Tourism in Myanmar
- Transport in Myanmar
  - Airports in Myanmar
  - Rail transport in Myanmar

== Education in Myanmar ==
- Education in Myanmar
  - Higher education in Myanmar
  - List of universities in Myanmar
  - List of universities and colleges in Yangon
  - List of Technological Universities in Myanmar
  - Secondary education in Myanmar
  - University Entrance Examination
- Monastic schools in Myanmar
  - Monastic examinations
- Tipitakadhara Tipitakakovida Selection Examinations
  - Tipitakadhara Dhammabhandagarika
  - List of Sāsana Azani recipients

== Health in Myanmar ==
Health in Myanmar

== See also ==
- List of international rankings
- Member state of the United Nations
- Outline of Asia
- Outline of geography
