= Human rights in Myanmar =

Human rights in Myanmar under its military regime have long been regarded as among the worst in the world. In 2026, Freedom House rated political rights -2 out of 40 and overall freedom score 4 out of 100 (not free).

== Overview ==
International human rights organisations including Human Rights Watch, Amnesty International, and the American Association for the Advancement of Science have repeatedly documented and condemned widespread human rights violations in Myanmar. The Freedom in the World 2011 report by Freedom House notes that "The military junta has... suppressed nearly all basic rights; and committed human rights abuses with impunity." In 2011 the "country's more than 2,100 political prisoners included about 429 members of the NLD, the victors in the 1990 elections." As of July 2013, according to the Assistance Association for Political Prisoners, there were about 100 political prisoners in Burmese prisons.

On 9 November 2012, Samantha Power, US President Barack Obama's Special Assistant to the President on Human Rights, wrote on the White House Blog in advance of the President's visit that "Serious human rights abuses against civilians in several regions continue, including against women and children." The United Nations General Assembly has repeatedly called on the former Burmese military governments to respect human rights and in November 2009 the General Assembly adopted a resolution "strongly condemning the ongoing systematic violations of human rights and fundamental freedoms" and calling on the then-ruling Burmese military junta "to take urgent measures to put an end to violations of international human rights and humanitarian law."

Forced labour, human trafficking and child labour are common. The Burmese military junta is also notorious for rampant use of sexual violence as an instrument of control, including allegations of systematic rapes and taking of sex slaves by the military, a practice which continued in 2012.

In March 2017, a three-member committee in the United Nations Human Rights Council ran a fact finding mission. This mission was aimed to "establish the facts and circumstances of the alleged recent human rights violations by military and security forces, and abuses, in Myanmar … with a view to ensuring full accountability for perpetrators and justice for victims".

Unfortunately, the government of Myanmar did not work with the Fact Finding Mission (FFM). They neither allow the UN special rapporteur on the situation of human rights in Myanmar into the country. What the Fact-Finding Mission found and announced was that security forces in Myanmar committed serious violations of international law "that warrant criminal investigation and prosecution", namely crimes against humanity, war crimes, and genocide.

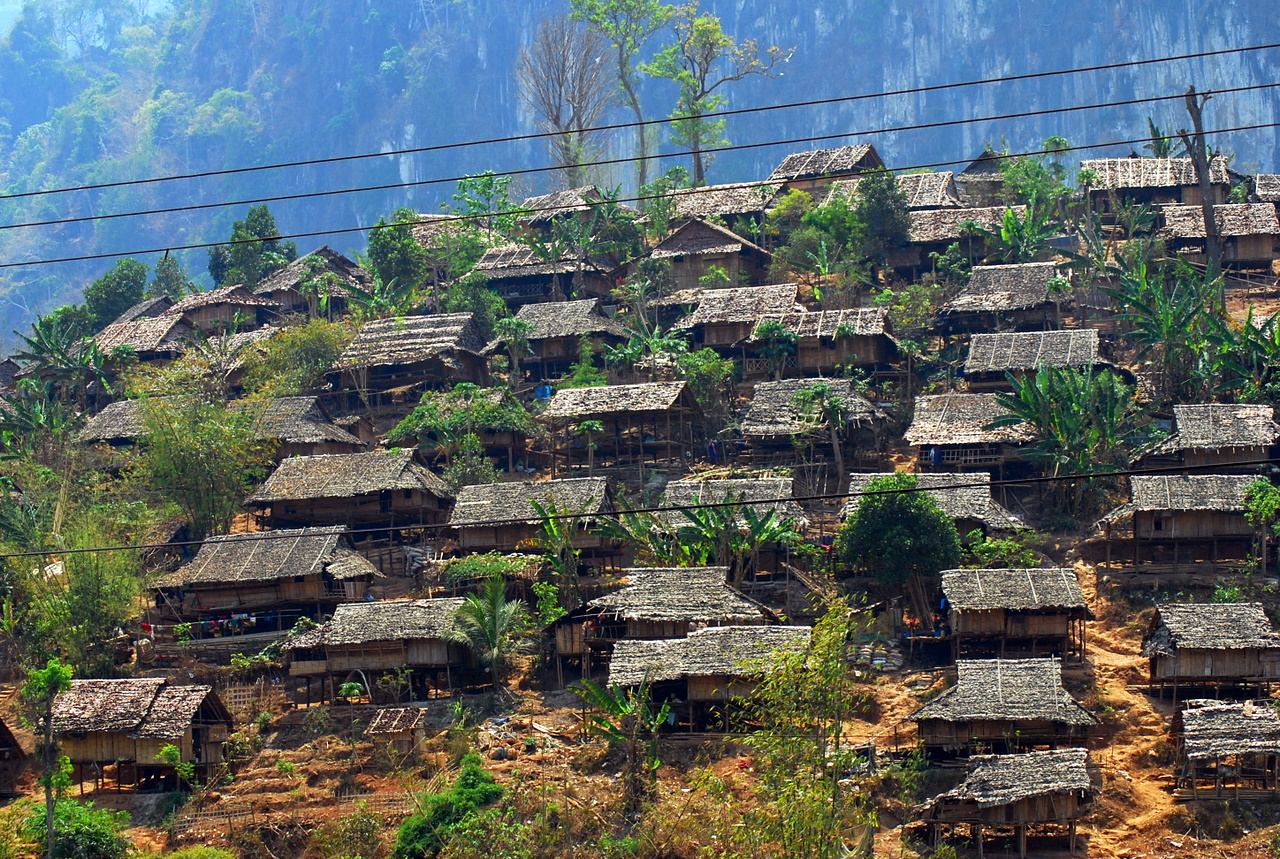
Mae La camp, Tak Province, Thailand, one of the largest of nine UNHCR camps in Thailand where over 700,000 Refugees, Asylum-seekers, and stateless persons have fled.

In response to these claims, the Myanmar Government has taken the position that the work of the FFM has been irresponsible and unconstructive. In September 2019, for example, U Kyaw Moe Tun, Myanmar Permanent Representative to the United Nations in Geneva, provided comments during a Session of the Human Rights Council in Geneva. U Kyaw Moe Tun said that the "People of Myanmar, who used to stand with the UN in their long struggle for democracy and human rights, are increasingly disappointed with the less than objective stand taken by some elements of the UN with respect to Myanmar."

Aung San Suu Kyi led the opposition National League for Democracy which was victorious in the 1990 general election. She was imprisoned or under house arrest for 15 out of the 21 years from 1990 to 2010. In 2021, she was imprisoned by the Myanmar military in a coup d'état. As of August 2022, she is being held in solitary confinement serving a 17-year sentence following a series of secret trials.

== Freedom of religion, minority rights, and internal conflict ==
Evidence has been gathered which suggests that the Burmese regime has marked certain ethnic minorities such as the Karen, Karenni and Shan for extermination or 'Burmisation'. This, however, has received little attention from the international community since it has been more subtle and indirect than the mass killings which occurred in places like Rwanda. According to Amnesty International, the Muslim Rohingya people have continued to suffer human rights violations under the rule of the junta which has ruled Burma since 1978, and many of them have fled to neighbouring Bangladesh as a result Violence against Christian communities such as the Kachin has also flared since fighting restarted in June 2011 in the 2011–2012 Kachin Conflict.

On 21 March 2022, in the 49th session of United Nations Human Rights Council Michelle Bachelet stated that the systematic brutality by security forces known as the Tatmadaw has inflamed pre-existing armed conflicts in multiple ethnic states. Amidst a “profound crisis” facing access to basic human rights in Myanmar following the coup in February 2021, hundreds of localized armed resistance groups have now formed across the country, triggering “widespread violence in areas that were previously stable”.

In 2022, Freedom House rated Myanmar's religious freedom as 1 out of 4, noting that the constitution provides for freedom of religion and recognises Buddhism, Christianity, Islam, Hinduism and animism. However, some anti-Muslim hate speech and discrimination has been amplified by social media, state institutions and mainstream news websites.

According to aid workers and activists such as Thinzar Shunlei Yi, Min Aung Hlaing's Union Government of Myanmar tightened restrictions on the distribution of menstrual pads on 20 April 2026. Although pro-government sources gave no official response, potential reasons include purported first-aid use by rebel forces. This falls in line with the reputed four cuts strategy. As a result, women are reportedly resorting to unsafe improvisations such as leaves or rags; black market sanitary prices observably tripled.

=== Continuing violence ===
On 30 June 2013, rioters in the west coast town of Thandwe burned two homes. The riot had started because of rumours that a Muslim man had raped an underage girl, or territory dispute between Rakhine and Muslim trishaw riders. Three Muslims were injured in the fire. Roads in and out of the town were blocked and a government spokesperson said the Myanmar police were working to find the offenders.

On 21 March 2022, the Biden administration declared that Myanmar's military has committed genocide against the Rohingya minority. The Secretary of State Antony Blinken stated that the US has seen evidence pointing to a clear intent to destroy the Rohingya, with reports of killings, mass rape, and arson.

On 4 July 2022, a United Nations investigator has documented apparent war crimes by the Myanmar military and released shocking footage of brutal killings allegedly in Sagaing region. On 10 May, 30 men were captured after a Myanmar military raid in Mondaingbin village, in Ye-U Township. At least five of them later appear dead, their hands bound, shot from behind. Few images obtained by Radio Free Asia (RFA) gives damning evidence of the brutal operation which reinforce a pattern of killings that bear the hallmarks of the military's atrocities.

=== Genocide allegations and crimes against Rohingya people ===
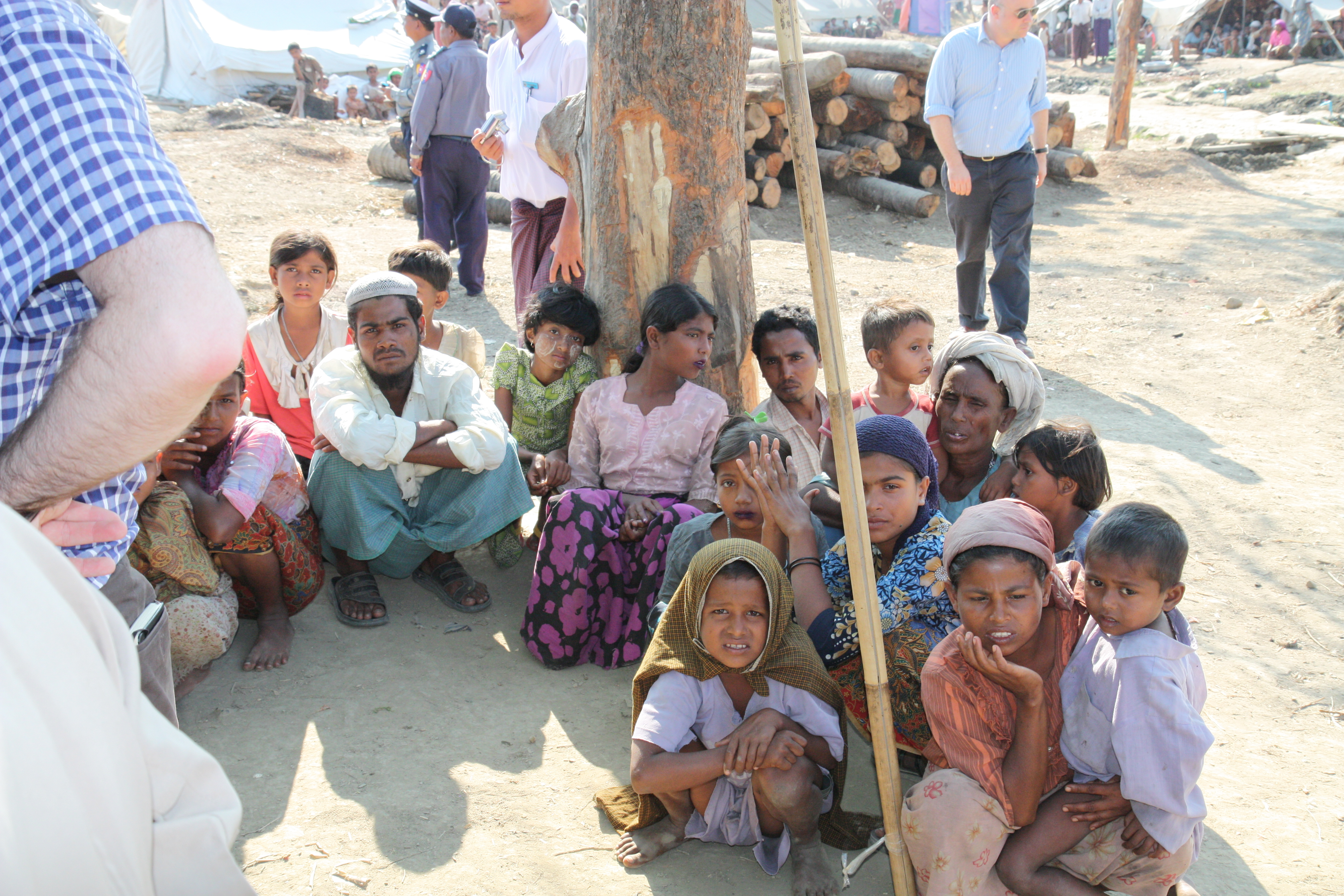
Displaced Rohingya people of Myanmar

The Rohingya people have consistently faced human rights abuses by the Burmese regime that has refused to acknowledge them as Burmese citizens (despite some of them having lived in Burma for over three generations)—the Rohingya have been denied Burmese citizenship since the enactment of a 1982 citizenship law. The Burmese regime has attempted to forcibly expel Rohingya and bring in non-Rohingyas to replace them—this policy has resulted in the expulsion of approximately half of the 800,000 Rohingya from Burma, while the Rohingya people have been described as "among the world's least wanted" and "one of the world's most persecuted minorities."

Rohingya are not allowed to travel without official permission, are banned from owning land, and are required to sign a commitment to have no more than two children. As of July 2012, the Myanmar government does not include the Rohingya minority group—classified as stateless Bengali Muslims from Bangladesh since 1982—on the government's list of more than 130 ethnic races and, therefore, the government states that they have no claim to Myanmar citizenship.

Since the democratic transition began in 2011, there has been continuous violence as 280 people have been killed and 140,000 forced to flee from their homes in the Rakhine state in 2014. A UN envoy reported in March 2013 that unrest had re-emerged between Myanmar's Buddhist and Muslim communities, with violence spreading to towns that are located closer to Yangon.

== Freedom of speech and political freedom ==
A 2004 Amnesty International report stated that, between 1989 and 2004, more than 1,300 political prisoners have been imprisoned after unfair trials. The prisoners, including National League for Democracy (NLD) leaders Aung San Suu Kyi and U Tin Oo, have "been wrongfully denied their liberty for peaceful acts that would not be considered crimes under international law", Amnesty International claims.

The Freedom House report notes that the authorities arbitrarily search citizens' homes, intercept mail, and monitor telephone conversations, and that the possession and use of telephones, fax machines, computers, modems, and software are criminalised.

According to Assistance Association for Political Prisoners (Burma), there were 1,547 political prisoners in Burma – the number had doubled from 1,100 in 2006 to 2,123 in 2008. As of April 2013, there were 176 political prisoners in Burmese prisons.

Political prisoners may be detained on charges seemingly unrelated to politics, complicating the case for their release. For example, National Democratic Force member and land rights activist Daw Bauk Ja was detained by police for medical negligence in 2013, though the detainment was linked to a 2008 death, the case for which had been withdrawn by family of the deceased in 2010. She had run for election in 2010 and also actively campaigned against the Myitsone Dam and took Yuzana Company to court for its land confiscations in Kachin State's Hukawng Valley region.

On 25 August 2025, Nay Thway, a resident of Taunggyi, was arrested for social media posts criticizing the 2025 elections. On 9 September, he was sentenced to 7 years hard labour. "Disrupting an election" carries a minimum of 3 years prison time, and a maximum penalty of death. Aung Ye Htut and Yan Naing Kyi Win were arrested on 19 September 2025 in Yangon after posting anti-election stickers.

The State Security and Peace Commission junta announced that any person or group that "complains about government-approved projects without valid evidence will be punished under existing laws." Political analysts speculated to The Irrawaddy that the announcement gives a pretext to criminalize dissent against Chinese backed development projects.

=== Freedom of the press ===
The Burmese media is tightly controlled by the government. Newspapers, journals and other publications are run under the Ministry of Information and undergo heavy censorship before publication. Reporters face severe consequences for criticising government officials, policy, or even reporting on criticism. Restrictions on media censorship were significantly eased in August 2012 following demonstrations by hundreds of protesters who wore shirts demanding that the government "Stop Killing the Press".

The most significant change has come in the form that media organisations will no longer have to submit their content to a censorship board prior to publication, however, as explained by one editorial in the exiled press Irrawaddy, this new "freedom" has caused some Burmese journalists to simply see the new law as an attempt to create an environment of self-censorship as journalists "are required to follow 16 guidelines towards protecting the three national causes – non-disintegration of the Union, non-disintegration of national solidarity, perpetuation of sovereignty – and "journalistic ethics" to ensure their stories are accurate and do not jeopardise national security."

On 3 September 2018 Myanmar court sentenced two Burmese reporters working for Reuters to seven years in prison allegedly for protecting state secrets. In August 2019, a Myanmar court sentenced a filmmaker to one year in prison with hard labor for criticizing the military on Facebook.

A Burmese filmmaker, Min Htin Ko Ko Gyi, was arrested on 12 April 2019 and formally charged under section 505(a) of the Myanmar Penal Code on 1 August 2019, for one-year prison on charges of criticizing the Myanmar military in his Facebook post. Min Htin Ko Ko Gyi is also a founder of the Human Dignity Film Institute (HDFI) and the Human Rights, Human Dignity International Film Festival. Nicholas Bequelin Director for East and South East Asia at Amnesty, condemned the punishment and called it 'cruel' considering serious health ailments that Min Htin Ko Ko Gyi is suffering from, one of which is liver cancer that demands specialist treatment.

On June 19, 2020, HRW urged the Myanmar government to immediately end a year-long government-enforced internet shutdown, which has affected more than a million people living in a conflict zone. HRW cited humanitarian workers stating that some villages are unaware of the coronavirus pandemic, due both to the internet shutdown as well as due to humanitarian workers being barred access to the villages.

==== Sai Zaw Thaike case ====
Sai Zaw Thaike (စိုင်း ဇော်သိုက်, born around the year 1984), a Myanmar photo-journalist working for an independent redaction Myanmar Now, became one the most publicized cases of the repression of journalists after the Burmese coup. In May 2023, Thaike went to report the consequences of cyclone Mocha as a photographer. On May 23rd 2023 he was arrested in Sittwe, the capital of Rakhine state. In September 2023 the military court in Rangoon (also known as Yangon) sentenced him to 20 years of prison with hard forced labor for various crimes amongst which was accusations of treason, violating a natural disaster management law for allegedly spreading false news to provoke fear and public panic. According to Myanmar Now and organizations like Reporters Without Borders it appears to be the most severe punishment since the coup in Myanmar in February 2021.

Committee to Protect Journalists reported in 2025 that Sai Zaw Thaike is subjected to physical abuse and retaliation punishments for informing the prison inspections about abuse of other prisoners. For this reason he was forced to carry containers with human feces, beaten daily and tortured. In 2025, Sai Zaw Thaike's case was featured in Amnesty International's Write for Rights campaign.

== Children's rights ==
According to Human Rights Watch, recruiting and kidnapping of children into the military is commonplace. An estimated 70,000 of the country's 350,000–400,000 soldiers are children. There are also multiple reports of widespread child labour.

=== Child soldiers ===
Child soldiers have and continued to play a major part in the Burmese Army as well as Burmese rebel movements. The Independent reported in June 2012 that "Children are being sold as conscripts into the Burmese military for as little as $40 and a bag of rice or a can of petrol." The UN's Special Representative of the Secretary-General for Children and Armed Conflict, Radhika Coomaraswamy, who stepped down from her position a week later, met representatives of the Government of Myanmar on 5 July 2012 and stated that she hoped the government's signing of an action plan would "signal a transformation".

In September 2012 the Burmese Army released 42 child soldiers and the International Labour Organization met with representatives of the government as well as the Kachin Independence Army to secure the release of more child soldiers. According to Samantha Power, a US delegation raised the issue of child soldiers with the government in October 2012. However, she did not comment on the government's progress towards reform in this area.

== State-sanctioned torture and rape ==
A 2002 report by The Shan Human Rights Foundation and The Shan Women's Action Network, License to Rape, details 173 incidents of rape and other forms of sexual violence, involving 625 girls and women, committed by Tatmadaw (Burmese Army) troops in Shan State, mostly between 1996 and 2001. The authors note that the figures are likely to be far lower than the reality. According to the report, "the Burmese military regime is allowing its troops systematically and on a widespread scale to commit rape with impunity in order to terrorize and subjugate the ethnic peoples of Shan State." Furthermore, the report states that "25% of the rapes resulted in death, in some incidences with bodies being deliberately displayed to local communities. 61% were gang-rapes; women were raped within military bases, and in some cases women were detained and raped repeatedly for periods of up to 4 months." The Burmese government denied the report's findings, stating that insurgents are responsible for violence in the region.

A 2003 report "No Safe Place: Burma's Army and the Rape of Ethnic Women" by Refugees International further documents the widespread use of rape by Burma's soldiers to brutalise women from five different ethnic nationalities.

Human rights organisations such as Amnesty International also report frequent torture of prisoners, including political prisoners.

=== Slavery and human trafficking ===
Forced labour and human trafficking are common in Myanmar. Human trafficking happens mostly to women who are unemployed and have low incomes. They are deceived by brokers that better opportunities and wages exist for them abroad. In 2017, the government reported 185 trafficking cases. The government of Burma makes little effort to eliminate human trafficking. The U.S. State Department reported that both the government and Tatmadaw were complicit in sex and labour trafficking. Women and girls from all ethnic groups and foreigners have been victims of sex trafficking in Myanmar. They are forced into prostitution, marriages or pregnancies. Sex trafficking in Myanmar has been fuelled by factors like internal conflict, political instability, land confiscation, poor border management, and government restrictions on providing travel documents.

A cyber-scam industry in Myanmar's borderlands has involved human trafficking, forced labour and other abuses. Many of the scam centres are in territories controlled by junta allies like the Border Guard Force. In August 2023, a report from the Office of the U.N. High Commissioner for Human Rights noted that at least 120,000 people in Myanmar were trapped in such centres by criminal gangs.

== Organ trading ==
The military forces took over Myanmar in 2021. A yearlong investigation conducted by CNN reveals that half of Myanmar's 54 million population lives below poverty line. This drives many of them to the extreme measures such as online organ trade. This illegal action of selling their personal organs can earn them a payment equal to a two-year salary. Many advertise the organ they wish to donate on social media, this is an endless cycle as families time and again find themselves online to trade their organs as money runs out.

== Labour ==
=== Forced labour ===
According to the International Confederation of Free Trade Unions several hundred thousand men, women, children and elderly people are forced to work against their will by the administration. Individuals refusing to work may be victims of torture, rape or murder. The International Labour Organization has continuously called on Burma to end the practice of forced labour since the 1960s. In June 2000, the ILO Conference adopted a resolution calling on governments to cease any relations with the country that might aid the junta to continue the use of forced labour.

=== Right to organise labour ===
Trade unions were banned when General Ne Win came to power in 1962. In 2010, amid growing calls for reform to labour laws, unofficial industrial action was taken at a number of garment factories in Rangoon, causing concern at government level. In October 2011, it was announced that trade unions had been legalised by a new law.

=== Labour rights improvements ===
An initiative was launched in 2014 by the Myanmar government and the International Labour Organization, in conjunction with the US, Japan and Denmark, to promote the development of fundamental labour rights and practice in Myanmar.

== Past condemnation and individual cases ==
=== 1990s ===
In a landmark legal case, some human rights groups sued the Unocal corporation, previously known as Union Oil of California and now part of the Chevron Corporation. They charged that since the early 1990s, Unocal has joined hands with dictators in Burma to turn thousands of its citizens into virtual slaves. Unocal, before being purchased, stated that they had no knowledge or connection to these alleged actions although it continued working in Burma. This was believed to be the first time an American corporation has been sued in a US court on the grounds that the company violated human rights in another country.

=== 2000s ===
The Freedom in the World 2004 report by Freedom House notes that "The junta rules by decree, controls the judiciary, suppresses all basic rights, and commits human rights abuses with impunity. Military officers hold all cabinet positions, and active or retired officers hold all top posts in all ministries. Official corruption is reportedly rampant both at the higher and local levels."

Brad Adams, director of Human Rights Watch's Asia division, in a 2004 address described the human rights situation in the country as appalling: "Burma is the textbook example of a police state. Government informants and spies are omnipresent. Average Burmese people are afraid to speak to foreigners except in most superficial of manners for fear of being hauled in later for questioning or worse. There is no freedom of speech, assembly or association."

From 2005 to 2007 NGOs found that violations of human rights included the absence of an independent judiciary, restrictions on Internet access through software-based censorship, that forced labour, human trafficking, and child labour were common, and that sexual violence was abundantly used as an instrument of control, including systematic rapes and taking of sex slaves as porters for the military. A strong women's pro-democracy movement has formed in exile, largely along the Thai border and in Chiang Mai. There was also said to be a growing international movement to defend women's human rights issues.

In a press release on 16 December 2005 the US State Department said UN involvement in Burma was essential and listed illicit narcotics, human rights abuses and political repression as serious problems that the UN needed to address.

According to Human Rights Defenders and Promoters (HRDP), on 18 April 2007, several of its members (Myint Aye, Maung Maung Lay, Tin Maung Oo and Yin Kyi) were met by approximately a hundred people led by a local official, U Nyunt Oo, and beaten up. Due to the attack, Myint Hlaing and Maung Maung Lay were badly injured and subsequently hospitalised. The HRDP alleged that this attack was condoned by the authorities and vowed to take legal action. Human Rights Defenders and Promoters was formed in 2002 to raise awareness among the people of Burma about their human rights.

=== 2010s ===
In April 2019, the UN appointed an American prosecutor as head of an independent team that will probe human rights violations in Myanmar's volatile Rakhine state, focusing on atrocities committed against Rohingya Muslims. However, Myanmar's ruling political party National League for Democracy disapproved of the new UN investigative mechanism.

=== 2020s ===
On 14 August 2022, UN High Commissioner for Human Rights Michelle Bachelet began a four-day official visit to Bangladesh. This is the first official visit by a UN Human Rights Chief to the country. Ms. Bachelet will go to Cox's Bazar where she will be able to visit camps housing Rohingya refugees from Myanmar and meet with refugees.

== See also ==
- Myanmar National Human Rights Commission
- Internet censorship in Myanmar
- Women's rights in Myanmar
- Freedom of religion in Myanmar
- LGBT rights in Myanmar
- War crimes during the Myanmar civil war (2021–present)
- Burma VJ
- Burma Center Prague
