= History of the Jews in Myanmar =

Burmese Jews မြန်မာဂျူးလူမျိုး יהודים בורמזיים
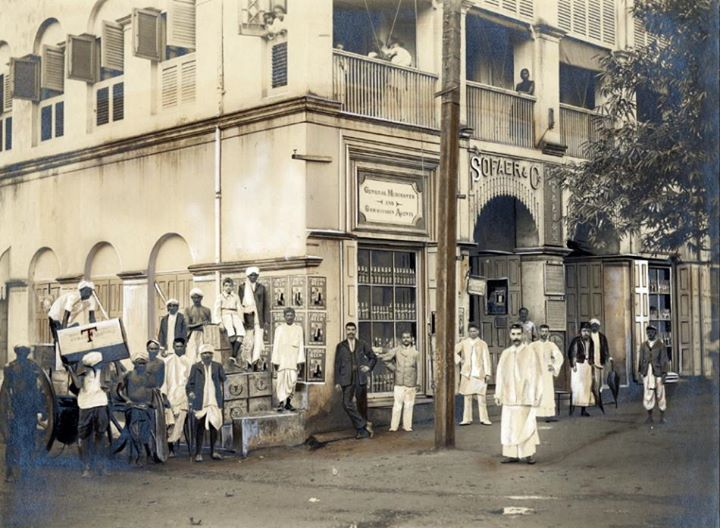

Total population
- 20

Regions with significant populations
- Yangon, Myanmar

Languages
- Burmese, English, Hebrew, Kuki-Chin languages

Religion
- Judaism

Related ethnic groups
- Baghdadi Jews, Israelis

The history of the Jews in Myanmar (formerly Burma) begins primarily in the mid-19th century, when hundreds of Jews emigrated from Iraq during the British colonial period. Cochin Jews came from India and both groups were part of the development of the British Empire, becoming allied with the British in Burma (now Myanmar). At its height in 1940, the community of Jews in the country stood at 2,500 members.

During and after the Second World War, many Jews left the country, first under pressure from the Japanese occupation of Burma, and later because of repression under the newly independent nationalist Burmese government. One synagogue survives in Yangon, the capital, and in the 21st century, it attracts an increasing number of tourists.

== History ==
The first recorded Jew in the country was Solomon Gabirol, who served as a commander in the army of King Alaungpaya in the 18th century. But it was in the mid-19th century, during the British colonial period, that Jewish merchants from Iraq and India began establishing sizable communities in Rangoon and Mandalay. The Baghdadi Jews had emigrated from Iraq to escape persecution and being subject to pogroms; they comprised most of the immigrants. Cochin Jews and the Bene Israel came from India. Under British rule, the local Jewish community prospered as merchants developed small businesses, and traders worked in cotton and rice.

The Baghdadi Jews established Musmeah Yeshua synagogue in Rangoon; it is the only synagogue still standing in Yangon or the country. It was first built in the 1850s as a small wooden structure, then rebuilt in 1896. The Jewish cemetery, containing 700 graves, is about six miles away. A Jewish school, for children up to middle-school age, had 200 students at its peak in 1910. After that, some parents sent their children to secular schools, especially as many Jewish men married Burmese or other ethnic women. In some cases, children were sent to India or Great Britain for higher education.

Jews were so established in their major communities that Rangoon and Pathein both elected Jewish mayors in the early 20th century. In this community, a number of the men "married out" to Burmese women. The Jewish community also established ties with British colonial officers and businessmen. A second synagogue, Beth El, was opened in 1932, reflecting the population growth. By 1940, the community numbered its peak of 2500 persons. Most were involved in business and industry, with some owning ice factories and bottling plants, others dealing in textiles and timber. The rest were primarily customs officials and traders."

In the early part of the twentieth century, various minority groups began to work toward establishing some autonomy, including the Karen people, who were indigenous to the territory. The Burmese were working toward nationalism; they had been later migrants from China in ancient times.

With the Japanese invasion in 1942, many Jews fled to India, as their British alliances made the Japanese hostile to them. Though the Japanese were allies of the Nazis, they did not have any particular antipathy towards the Jews. At the same time, they viewed the local Jews with suspicion as a pro-British and a "European" group.

In the drive for independence, the Burmese majority worked to dispossess and defeat the minority groups and strictly limited their rights in the new government.

Burma was the first Asian nation to recognize Israel, and it maintains diplomatic relations with the Jewish state. Israel opened its first Diplomatic mission in Yangon in 1953, and in 1957 it became an embassy. Both nations shared a Socialist outlook in their early years and held extensive contacts between their respective leaders.

Following the nationalization of businesses in 1964, the remaining Jewish community suffered further decline. Beth El closed. Most members moved to other countries. The country's last rabbi left in 1969.

Since the late 20th century, some of the Mizo people, who are ethnically descended from modern-day China and live in northwestern Burma, on the Indian border, have identified as Jews. They have taken on the belief that they descend from the lost tribe of Manasseh, based on certain traditions that are similar to those of Judaism. Some have converted to Judaism and immigrated to Israel. They are known as the Bnei Menashe.

=== 21st-century Yangon Jewish community ===
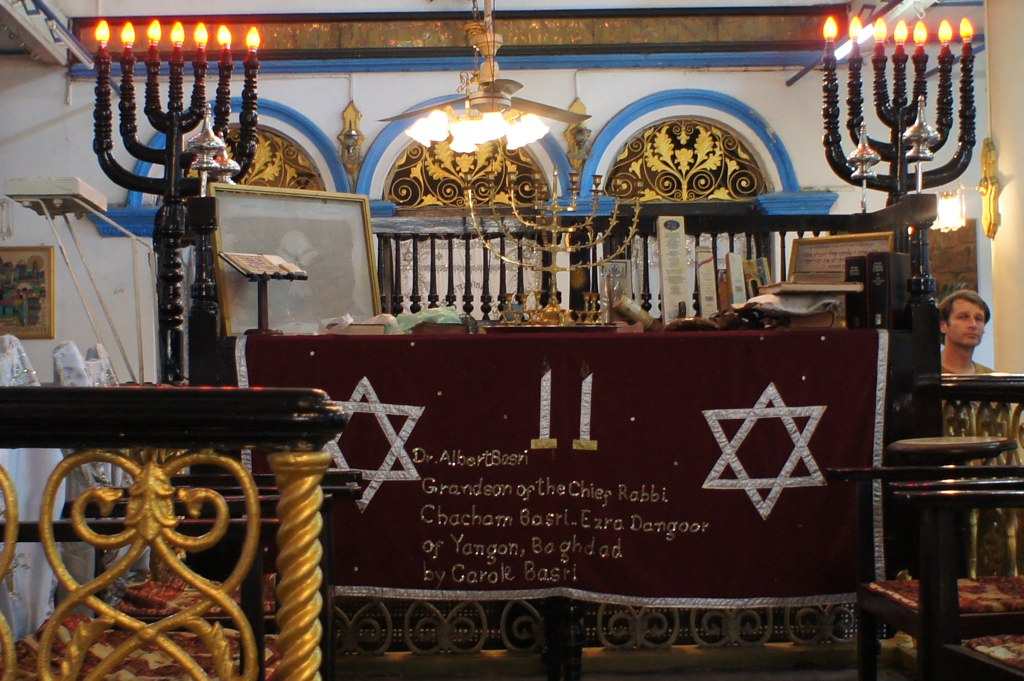
Musmeah Yeshua synagogue bimah

As of 2002, 20 Jews remained in Yangon, the capital city. Many Burmese Jews have immigrated to Israel over the years, after India achieved independence. The local Jews use the Musmeah Yeshua Synagogue, but it rarely draws the required quorum of men for a full religious service. Often, employees of the Israeli embassy help maintain regular services; Moses Samuels, a native-born descendant of Jewish immigrants from Iraq, took on his father's role as Trustee of the synagogue to keep it up, along with the cemetery. His son Sammy Samuels was also committed to the future of the synagogue. The senior Samuels has given numerous tours to visitors. In 2011, the congregation had 45 Jews.

In 2007, the US-ASEAN Council for Business and Technology, the US-ASEAN Business Council's 501(c)(3) tax-exempt organization, obtained a license from the United States Department of the Treasury's Office of Foreign Assets Control (OFAC) to raise funds for a humanitarian project: the maintenance and restoration of the Musmeah Yeshua Synagogue in Yangon. (The license was needed to operate outside the US economic sanctions against the government of Myanmar because of its human rights abuses; sanctions were lifted in 2012.) The Council planned to provide for the synagogue's monthly expenses, complete restoration and maintenance of the synagogue, and assist the synagogue to purchase and establish a new cemetery.

On December 8, 2013, an interfaith event attended by the Myanmar Presidential Minister U Aung Min, US Ambassador Derek Mitchell, Israeli Ambassador Hagay Moshe Behar, the Yangon Religious Council, and other guests celebrated the completion of the restoration and establishment of the synagogue as self-supporting. They credited anthropologist Ruth Cernea, who wrote a history of the Jewish community in Rangoon; Laura Hudson of the Council, and Stuart Spencer, a member of the synagogue's diaspora, as three leaders of this project. The Yangon Heritage Trust has installed a blue plaque at the synagogue, marking its historical significance.

On July 26, 2020, the MICCI Myanmar - Israel Chamber of Commerce, Industry and Innovation was launched in Musmea Yeshua Synagogue in Yangon by the Ambassador of Israel, Ronen Gilor, the head of the Jewish Community, Sammy Samuels, the President of UMFCCI, together with Myanmar and Israeli business leaders. The MICCI was incorporated by the DICA of the Ministry of Investment and Foreign Relations of the Republic of the Union of Myanmar.

== Representation in other media ==
- Charmaine Craig's novel Miss Burma (2017) is inspired by the lives of her mother, Louisa Charmaine Benson Craig, and her maternal grandparents, and their roles in Burmese history. Her grandmother, Naw Chit Khin, was a Karen woman, and her grandfather, Saw Benson (Moses Ben-Zion Koder) was Jewish. Her mother won "Miss Burma" as the first beauty queen in 1956.
