= Freedom of religion in Myanmar =

Myanmar has been under the rule of repressive military regimes since 1962. After the 1974 Socialist constitution was suspended in 1988, constitutional protection of religious freedom has not existed, following the bloody suppression of the 8888 Uprising. The authorities generally permitted most adherents of registered religious groups to worship as they choose; however, the government imposed restrictions on certain religious activities and is accused of abusing the right to freedom of religion.

== Basic facts ==
Myanmar had a population of approximately 54.5 million in 2023. The 2014 census noted that 88% of the population was Buddhist, 6% Christian, 4.3% Muslim, 1% Animist and 0.5% Hindu. However, the large movement of Rohingyas in 2017 has halved the number of Muslims in the country.

== Accusations ==
The government is accused of actively promoting Theravada Buddhism (practised by 90% of the population) over other religions, particularly among members of ethnic minorities. Christian and Islamic groups continued to have trouble obtaining permission to repair existing places of worship or build new ones. Anti-Muslim violence continued, as did the close monitoring of Muslim activities. Although there were no new reports of forced conversions of non-Buddhists, the government applied pressure on students and poor youth to convert to Buddhism. Adherence or conversion to Buddhism is generally a prerequisite for promotion to senior government and military ranks.

Evangelism is banned, although Sunday schools and church activities are not affected.

== Religious demography ==
The popular form of Buddhism in Myanmar is Theravada Buddhism with a mixture of astrology, numerology, fortune-telling, and veneration of indigenous pre-Buddhist era deities called "nats". Buddhist monks, including novices, number more than 400,000 and depend on the laity for their material needs, including clothing and daily donations of food. A small population of Buddhist nuns also exist. The principal minority religious groups include Christian groups (mostly Baptists (~70%) and Roman Catholics (~25%), and a small number of Anglicans, and an array of other Protestant denominations), Muslims (mostly Sunni), Hindus, and practitioners of traditional Chinese and indigenous religions. According to official statistics, almost 90 percent of the population practice Buddhism, 6 percent practice Christianity, and 4 percent practice Islam. The US government claims that the numbers might be distorted in favor of Buddhists; however, this cannot be verified. There is also a small Jewish community in Yangon, of about 25 adherents and a synagogue, but there is no resident rabbi to conduct services.

The country is ethnically diverse, with some correlation between ethnicity and religion. Theravada Buddhism is the dominant religion among the majority Burman ethnic group and among the Shan, Arakanese, and Mon ethnic minorities of the eastern, western, and southern regions. Christianity is the dominant religion among the Chin ethnic group of the Western region and has some adherents amongst the Kachin and Naga ethnic groups, who continue to practice traditional indigenous religions. Christianity is also practised widely among the Karen and Karenni ethnic groups of the southern and eastern regions, although many Karen and Karenni are Buddhist. In addition, some ethnic Indians are Christian. Hinduism is practised chiefly by Burmese of Indian origin, who are concentrated in major cities and in the south central region. Islam is practised widely in Rakhine State, where it is the dominant religion of the Rohingya minority, and in Rangoon, Ayeyarwady, Magway, and Mandalay Divisions. Some Burmans, Indians, and ethnic Bengalis also practice Islam. Chinese ethnic minorities generally practice traditional Chinese religions. Traditional indigenous beliefs are practised widely among smaller ethnic groups in the highland regions. Practices drawn from those indigenous beliefs persist widely in popular Buddhist rituals, especially in rural areas.

== Status of religious freedom up to 2009 ==
=== Restrictions on religious freedom ===
The Government continued to show preference for Theravada Buddhism while controlling the organisation and restricting the activities and expression of the Buddhist clergy (Sangha), although some monks have resisted such control. Based on the 1990 Sangha Organization Law, the Government banned any organisation of Buddhist monks other than the nine state-recognized monastic orders. These nine orders submit to the authority of the SMNC, the members of which are indirectly elected by monks. Violations of this ban are punishable by immediate public defrocking, and often by criminal penalties.

There are reports that the ITBMU, while in principle open to the public, accepted only candidates who were approved by government authorities or recommended by a senior, pro-government Buddhist abbot.

The Government infiltrated or monitored the meetings and activities of virtually all organisations, including religious organisations, subjecting all media, including religious publications, and on occasion sermons, to control and censorship.

During the reporting period, the Government harassed a group of Buddhist worshippers who visited the Shwedagon Pagoda in Rangoon every Tuesday, the day of the week that Aung San Suu Kyi was born, to pray at the Tuesday pillar for her release and the release of all political prisoners in the country.

Authorities frequently refused to approve requests for gatherings to celebrate traditional Christian and Islamic holidays and restricted the number of Muslims who could gather in one place. On 22 March 2007, authorities detained Htin Kyaw, when he publicly protested the denial of his religious freedom to become a monk. Htin Kyaw had participated in earlier demonstrations against deteriorating economic and social conditions. Rangoon authorities then enforced a 1995 prohibition against any opposition political party member from being ordained as a monk or religious leader and forbade the abbot of a monastery in North Okkalapa in Rangoon to ordain Htin Kyaw.

On 23 January 2007, Christian Solidarity Worldwide (CSW) released a report that documented the Government's restrictions, discrimination, and persecution against Christians in the country for more than a decade. Subsequently, the Ministry of Religious Affairs pressured religious organisations in the country to publish statements in government-controlled media denying they had any connection with CSW or to condemn the report, and to reject the idea that religious discrimination existed in the country.

Government authorities continued to prohibit Christian clergy from proselytising in some areas. Christian groups reported that several times during the period covered by this report, local authorities denied applications for residency permits of known Christian ministers attempting to move into a new township. The groups indicated this was not a widespread practice, but depended on the individual community and local council. In some instances, local authorities reportedly confiscated National Identity Cards of new converts to Christianity. Despite this, Christian groups reported that church membership grew, even in predominantly Buddhist regions of the country.

During the reporting period, authorities in the Rangoon area closed several house churches because they did not have proper authorisation to hold religious meetings. Other Rangoon home churches remained operational only after paying bribes to local officials. At the same time, the authorities made it difficult, although not impossible, to obtain approval for the construction of "authorized" churches.

In August 2006, NaSaKa, the Government's border security force, ordered eight Rohingya Muslim communities in Rathedaung Township, Rakhine State, to close their religious centres, including 5 mosques, 4 madrassahs, 18 moqtobs (premadrassahs), and 3 hafez khanas (Qur'an reciting centres). Later, local authorities allowed two madrassahs to reopen.

The Religious Affairs Ministry has stipulated in the past that permission to construct new religious buildings "depends upon the population of the location;" however, there appeared to be no correlation between the construction of pagodas and the demand for additional places of Buddhist worship. In most regions of the country, Christian and Islamic groups that sought to build small places of worship on side streets or other inconspicuous locations were able to do so only with informal approval from local authorities; however, informal approval from local authorities created a tenuous legal situation. When local authorities or conditions have changed, informal approvals for construction have been rescinded abruptly and construction halted. In some cases, authorities demolished existing church buildings.

The Myanmar Institute of Theology (MIT) in Insein Township, Rangoon is the premier seminary for Baptists throughout the country. To accommodate a rapidly increasing enrolment, MIT raised funds to build a new classroom building and purchase building supplies. At the last minute, government officials refused to grant a building permit. However, newly built churches are evident in several parts of the state. In Rangoon, Mandalay, and elsewhere, authorities allowed construction of new community centres by various Christian groups only if they agreed not to hold services there or erect Christian signs.

It remained extremely difficult for Muslims to get permission to repair existing mosques, although internal renovations were allowed in some cases. In some parts of Rakhine State, authorities cordoned off mosques and forbade Muslims to worship in them.

State censorship authorities continued to enforce special restrictions on local publication of the Bible, the Qur'an, and Christian and Islamic publications in general. The most onerous restriction was a list of more than 100 prohibited words that the censors would not allow in Christian or Islamic literature because they are "indigenous terms" or derived from the Pali language long used in Buddhist literature. Many of these words have been used and accepted by some of the country's Christian and Islamic groups since the colonial period. Organizations that translate and publish non-Buddhist religious texts were appealing these restrictions. In addition, censors have sometimes objected to passages of the Old Testament and the Qur'an that they believe approve the use of violence against nonbelievers. There have been no reports of arrests or prosecutions for possession of any traditional religious literature in recent years.

Authorities also restricted the quantity of bibles and Qur'ans brought into the country. During the reporting period, however, individuals continued to carry Bibles and Qur'ans into the country in small quantities for personal use. There were no reports that authorities intercepted or confiscated Qur'ans at border entry points, but religious leaders complained that postal workers steal them to sell on the black market.

In general, the Government has not allowed permanent foreign religious missions to operate in the country since the mid-1960s, when it expelled nearly all foreign missionaries and nationalised all private schools and hospitals. Christian groups have brought in foreign clergy and religious workers for visits as tourists, but they have been careful to ensure that the Government did not perceive their activities as proselytising. Some Christian theological seminaries also continued to operate, as did several Bible schools and madrassahs. The Government has allowed some members of foreign religious groups, such as the Church of Jesus Christ of Latter-day Saints (Mormons), to enter the country to provide humanitarian assistance or English language training to government officials. Some of these groups did not register with the Myanmar Council of Churches, but were able to conduct religious services without government interference.

The Government sometimes expedited its burdensome passport issuance procedures for Muslims making the Hajj or Buddhists going on pilgrimage to Bodhgaya, India, although it limited the number of pilgrims. In 2006, government officials allowed approximately 3,000 Muslims to participate in the Hajj. Government and private travel agencies processed approximately 2,500 Buddhist pilgrims to travel to Bodhgaya in India.

Non-Buddhists continued to experience employment discrimination at upper levels of the public sector. Few have ever been promoted to the level of Director General or higher. There were no non-Buddhists who held flag rank in the armed forces, although a few Christians reportedly achieved the rank of lieutenant colonel. The Central Executive Committee of the largest opposition group - the National League for Democracy - also included no non-Buddhists, although individual members from most religious groups in the country supported the party. The Government discouraged Muslims from enlisting in the military, and Christian or Muslim military officers who aspired for promotion beyond the rank of major were encouraged by their superiors to convert to Buddhism. Some Muslims who wished to join the military reportedly had to list "Buddhist" as their religion on their application, though they were not required to convert.

=== Rohingya Muslims ===
Rohingya Muslims, although essentially treated as illegal foreigners, were not issued Foreigner Registration Cards. Instead, the Government gave some of them "Temporary Registration Cards" (TRC). UNHCR estimated that only 650,000 of the approximately 800,000 Rohingyas possessed TRCs. Authorities have insisted that Muslim men applying for TRCs submit photos without beards. The authorities did not allow government employees of the Islamic faith, including village headmen, to grow beards, and dismissed some who already had beards. The authorities also did not consider many non-Rohingya Muslims to be citizens. In order for these Muslims to receive National Registration Cards and passports, they must pay large bribes. Ethnic Burman Muslims pay less than Muslims from ethnic minority groups (primarily those of Indian or Bengali descent).

In 2006, a prominent Muslim religious organisation asked the Rakhine State Peace and Development Council Chairman, the Regional Military Commander, and the Ministry of Religious Affairs to lift marriage restrictions for Rohingya Muslims in Rakhine State. At the end of the reporting period, they had yet to receive a response.

In Rangoon, Muslims can usually obtain birth certificates for newborns, but local authorities refused to allow them to place the names of the babies on their household registers.

Authorities generally did not grant permission to Rohingya or Muslim Arakanese to travel from their hometowns for any purpose; however, permission was sometimes obtainable through bribery. Non-Arakanese Muslims were given more freedom to travel; however, they were also required to seek permission, which was usually granted after a bribe was paid. Muslims residing in Rangoon could visit beach resort areas in Thandwe, Rakhine State, but could not return to Rangoon without the signature of the Regional Military Commander. Those with money were able to bribe local officials to return. Muslims residing outside of Rakhine State often were barred from return travel to their homes if they visited other parts of Rakhine State.

Rohingyas did not have access to state-run schools beyond primary education and were unable to obtain employment in any civil service positions. Muslim students from Rakhine State who completed high school were not granted permits to travel outside the state to attend college or university. In lieu of a diploma, Rohingya high school graduates received a sheet of paper that stated they would receive a diploma upon presentation of a citizenship card; however, Rohingyas can never obtain such a card.

Many of the approximately 25,000 Rohingya Muslims remaining in refugee camps in Bangladesh refused to return because they feared human rights abuses, including religious persecution.

In 2017, the military carried out a crackdown on Rohingya people in Rakhine State; in 2022, the US Secretary of State determined that members of the Burmese military had committed genocide and crimes against humanity against the Rohingya people. An estimated 1.6 million Rohingya have fled to Bangladesh, Thailand and India; by the end of 2022, the UNHCR reported that approximately 148,000 Rohingya were being held in displacement camps in the country.

=== Abuses of religious freedom ===
Aung San Suu Kyi, leader of the opposition National League for Democracy (NLD), was in prison or house arrest from 2003 to 2010. When she was arrested, several monks in her convoy were also attacked. Buddhists who travelled to pagodas to pray for her release were also arrested.

There followed many arrests of clergy, including Abbot Wila Tha and his assistant Than Kakesa from the Buddhist monastery of U Shwe Maw village, Taungup Township, and Yeh Zaw, a member of the Phawkkan Evangelical Church who wrote a letter to the regime leader urging him to end the persecution of his church. There were also reports of buildings being confiscated or being used instead for Buddhist purposes.

There continued to be credible reports from diverse regions of the country that government officials compelled persons, Buddhists and non-Buddhists alike, especially in rural areas, to contribute money, food, or materials to state-sponsored projects to build, renovate, or maintain Buddhist religious shrines or monuments. The Government denied that it used coercion and called these contributions "voluntary donations" consistent with Buddhist ideas of making merit. In April 2006, authorities in Lashio reportedly tried to coerce merchants to contribute large sums to construct a Buddhist shrine. Christian merchants refused to participate and the funds raised were well below the authorities' target.

=== Forced religious conversion ===
Muslim and Christian community leaders reported that during the period covered by this report, authorities had moved away from a campaign of forced conversion to Buddhism and instead focused on enticing non-Buddhists to convert to Buddhism by offering charity or bribery. Conversion of non-Buddhists, coerced or otherwise, is part of a longstanding government campaign to "Burmanize" ethnic minority regions. This campaign has coincided with increased military presence and pressure. In 2005, there was a single, unverified report of forced conversion at gunpoint in Chin State; however, Christian groups reported that such violent cases were less frequent than in earlier years. In September 2006, Chin sources reported that 15 students withdrew from a government-operated hostel for girls in Matupi, Chin State, after formerly voluntary Buddhist evening prayers became compulsory for all the hostel residents. Although the girls received free school fees, food, and accommodation, they complained they felt pressured to become Buddhist. Also, in many state schools of Burma, students are to recite Buddhist prayers every morning. In Kanpetlet, Chin State, NaTaLa operated a school exclusively for Buddhist students and guaranteed them government jobs after graduation. Christian children had to agree to convert to Buddhism if they wanted to attend this school.

There were no reports of forced religious conversion of minor US citizens who had been abducted or illegally removed from the United States, or of the refusal to allow such citizens to return to the United States.

=== Societal abuses and discrimination ===
Preferential treatment for Buddhists and widespread prejudice against ethnic Indians, particularly ethnic Rohingya Muslims, were key sources of social tensions between the Buddhist majority and Christian and Muslim minorities.

During this time, there were reports of violent clashes between Muslims and Buddhists in Magway Division, Shwe Settaw, Chauk, Salin and Kyauk Pyu.

Since 1994, when Buddhist members split away from the KNU (Karen National Union) to organise the pro-government Democratic Karen Buddhist Army (DKBA), there have been armed conflicts between the DKBA and the predominantly Christian anti-government KNU. Although the DKBA reportedly includes some Christians and there are some Buddhists in the KNU, the armed conflict between the two Karen groups has had strong religious overtones. There were also unverified reports that DKBA authorities continued to expel villagers who converted to Christianity.

During the reporting period, a Burmese language document surfaced titled, "Program to Eliminate Christianity." The document suggested 17 points for countering Christianity in the country; however, the source of the document was unknown and several grammatical errors raised questions about its authenticity. There was no definite evidence to link the document to the Government.

== 2021 military coup ==
Aung San Suu Kyi became state counsellor (prime minister) on March 30, 2016. On February 1, 2021, she was arrested and deposed by the military, along with other members of the National League for Democracy party. At this time, the country came under military rule and the military cracked down on protestors, activists and journalists. In less than 2 years, 15,500 people were arrested and reports of torture were widespread.

== Freedom of religion in the 2020s ==
In 2019, the USCIRF reported, "the Burmese government continued to commit widespread and egregious religious freedom violations, particularly against Rohingya Muslims." The report noted operations in Rakhine State that led to the large-scale displacement of Rohingya, with 910,000 civilians in Bangladeshi refugee camps, including Muslims, Christians, and Hindus and 120,000 in Myanmar camps.

In 2020, Freedom House rated Burma's religious freedom as 1 out of 4, noting that the constitution provides for freedom of religion and recognises Buddhism, Christianity, Islam, Hinduism and animism. However, some anti-Muslim hate speech and discrimination has been amplified by social media, state institutions and mainstream news websites. The government also, in practice, interferes with religious groups and discriminates against minority groups through actions such as refusing permission for gatherings, restricting proselytisation and allowing the Anti-Muslim Ma Ba Tha organisation to establish "Muslim-free" villages.

In March 2023, Christian Solidarity Worldwide noted the arrests of 20,000 people since the coup, the displacement of 1.3 million people and the destruction of churches, temples and mosques.

On 22 October 2026, the central mosque in Nawnghkio, Shan State, was seized as "public property" by the Tatmadaw. The 2 imams were sentenced to 11 years in prison for allegedly supporting the Ta'ang National Liberation Army and People's Defence Force during Operation 1027. Before, the mosque was raided and closed on July 2025 after the TNLA left the town.

== See also ==
- Religion in Myanmar
- Irreligion in Myanmar
- Human rights in Myanmar
