= Musmeah Yeshua Synagogue =

Synagogue in Yangon, Myanmar

- Hebrew: בית כנסת משמיע ישועה
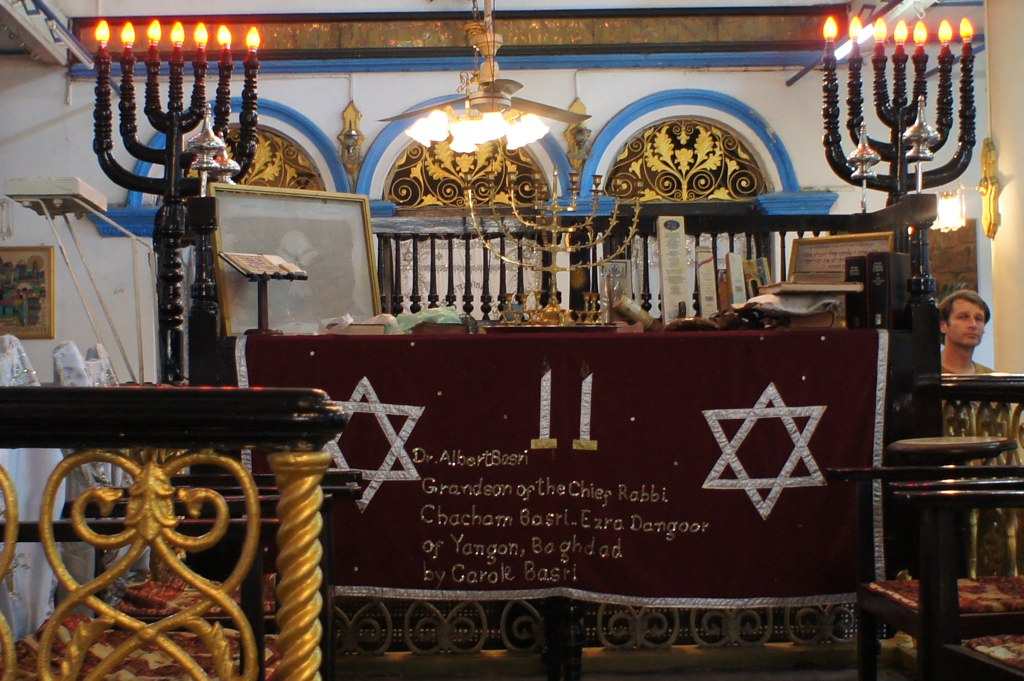
- Bimah of the Musmeah Yeshua Synagogue

- Location of the synagogue in Myanmar

Religion
- Affiliation: Judaism
- Rite: Edot Hamizrach
- Ecclesiastical or organizational status: Synagogue
- Leadership: Rabbi Sammy Samuels
- Year consecrated: 1896
- Status: Active

Location
- Location: 85, 26th Street, Yangon
- Country: Myanmar (formerly Burma)
- Interactive map of Musmeah Yeshua Synagogue
- Coordinates: 16°46′27″N 96°09′14″E

Architecture
- Groundbreaking: 1893
- Completed: 1896
- Materials: Stone

The Musmeah Yeshua Synagogue (Hebrew: בית כנסת משמיע ישועה) is a synagogue, located in downtown Yangon, Myanmar. Completed in 1896 to replace an earlier wooden synagogue that was erected in 1854, the current stone synagogue is the only synagogue in Myanmar.

The synagogue stands between Indian paint shops and Muslim traders on a small street near the city centre in what is now a predominantly Muslim neighborhood. A plaque at the entrance of the building states that the present stone building, which was built between 1893 and 1896, replaced an earlier, smaller wooden structure that was erected in 1854. It is one of 188 sites on the Yangon City Development Council’s list of heritage buildings. It serves the few remaining Jews of the country, mostly descendants of Baghdadi Jews from Iraq.

== History ==
=== Early years ===
The first synagogue was built in the 1850s for the increasing numbers of Baghdadi Jews from the Middle East, and Bene Israel and Cochini Jews from India arriving during British rule in Burma. It was a wooden building in 1854. The plot of land was granted by the British Colonial Government. The current building was completed in 1896.

The community once had 126 Sifrei Torah at Musmeah Yeshua. The Jewish cemetery is approximately 9.7 km (6 mi) away and was established in the 19th century; it has some 700 graves.

A second synagogue, Beth El, was opened in 1932, reflecting the population growth. The Jewish community worked as merchants and traders, and also with the British colonial government. In 1940, before the outbreak of the Second World War, the Jewish community in Rangoon reached its peak of 2,500 persons. Many Jews fled to India due to the Japanese occupation, as they were considered suspect as allies of the British. Beth El closed after the war due to the population decline.

=== Burma's independence ===
Following Burma’s independence in 1948, the new government granted approval for an extension of the synagogue. More Burmese Jews left after the Burmese army seized power in 1962, as the government nationalised most businesses in the 1960s and 1970s. By the turn of the 21st century, there were fewer than 50 Jews in Myanmar.

In 2007, the US-ASEAN Council for Business and Technology, the US-ASEAN Business Council's 501(c)(3) tax-exempt organization, obtained a license from the United States Department of the Treasury's Office of Foreign Assets Control (OFAC) to raise funds for a humanitarian project: the maintenance and restoration of the Musmeah Yeshua Synagogue in Yangon. (The license was needed due to current US economic sanctions of Myanmar because of its human rights abuses; sanctions were lifted in 2012.) The Council planned to raise enough funds to provide for the synagogue's monthly expenses, complete restoration and maintenance of the synagogue, and assist the synagogue in purchasing and establishing a new cemetery. The government wanted to move all cemeteries out of the city.

=== Restoration ===
Restoration was completed in 2013, and other goals were achieved. On December 8, 2013, an interfaith event attended by the Myanmar Presidential Minister U Aung Min, US Ambassador Derek Mitchell, Israeli Ambassador Hagay Moshe Behar, the Yangon Religious Council, and other guests celebrated the completion of the restoration and the establishment of the synagogue as self-supporting. They credited anthropologist Ruth Cernea, who wrote a history of the Jewish community in Rangoon; Laura Hudson of the Council, and Stuart Spencer, a member of the synagogue's diaspora, as three leaders of this project.

During Cyclone Nargis in May 2008, the synagogue lost its roof and sustained water damage.

In 2015, the current Jewish population of Myanmar, including Yangon, was fewer than 19. Moses Samuels (Hebrew: משה בן יצחק שמואלי), long the Trustee of the synagogue, died on May 29, 2015, in Yangon. Surviving him was his widow, Nelly (נלי); and his children Samuel "Sammy" (שמואל בן משה), Dina (דינה בת משה), and Kaznah (גזנה בת משה) Samuels. Sammy returned to Myanmar after studying at Yeshiva University in New York for three years. While there, he promoted travel to Yangon. Since his return, he has established a travel agency and two hotels in the city. The synagogue is ranked as among the top ten attractions in the city by TripAdvisor.

On June 6, 2016, Yangon Heritage Trust and Yangon Regional Government "awarded a commemorative blue heritage plaque to Yangon's only Synagogue" to remember the Jewish community who lived in Yangon for many generations and to recognize the diverse faiths still alive in the city today.

== Gallery ==
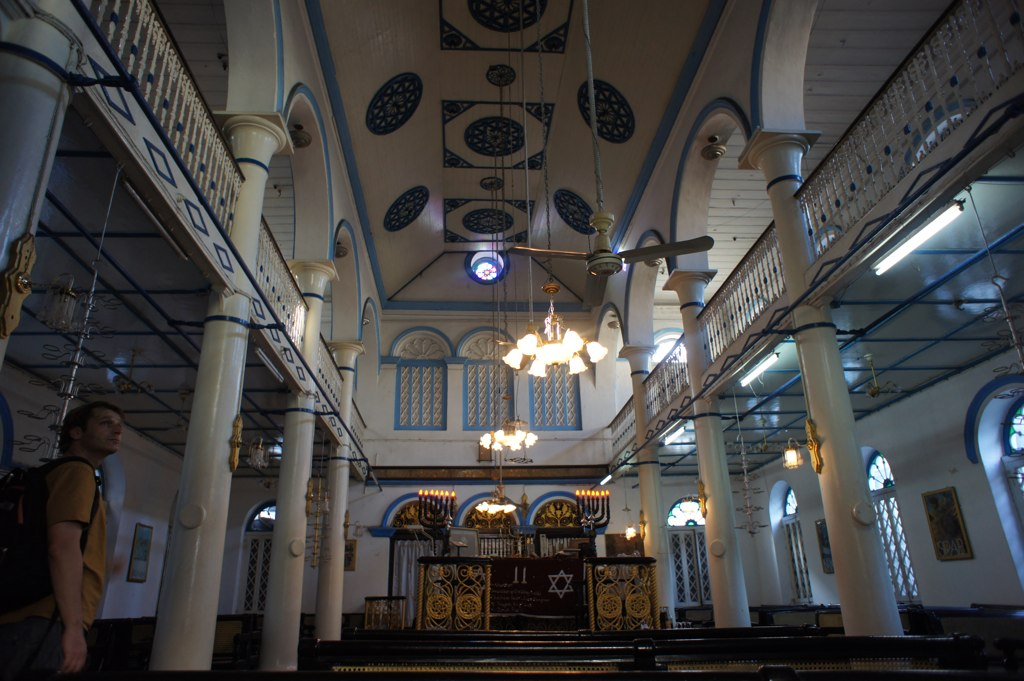
Interior

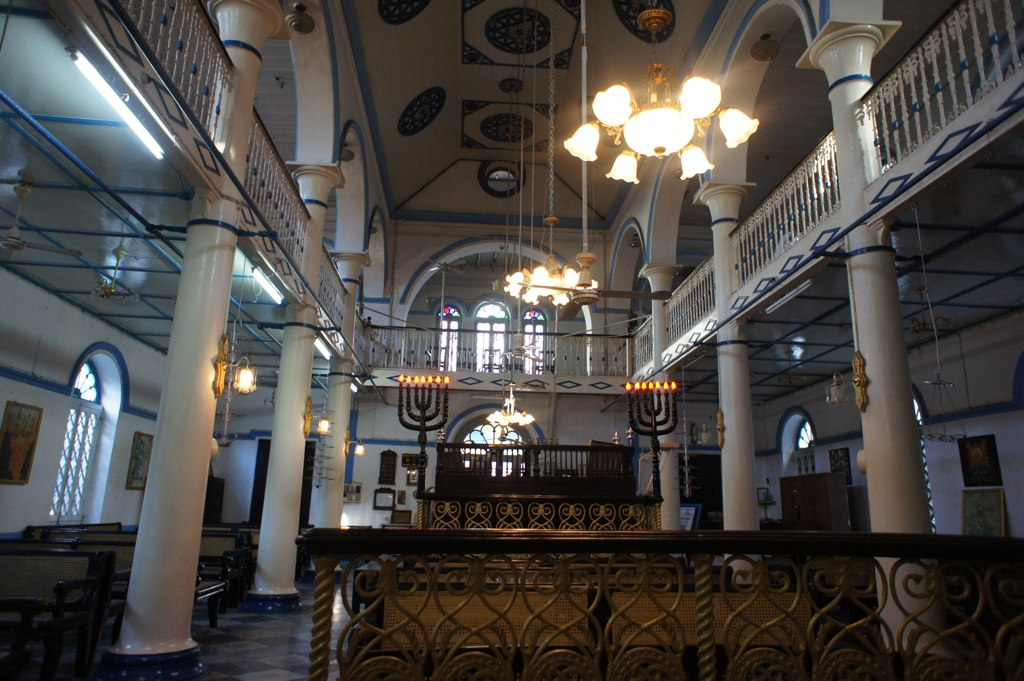
interior

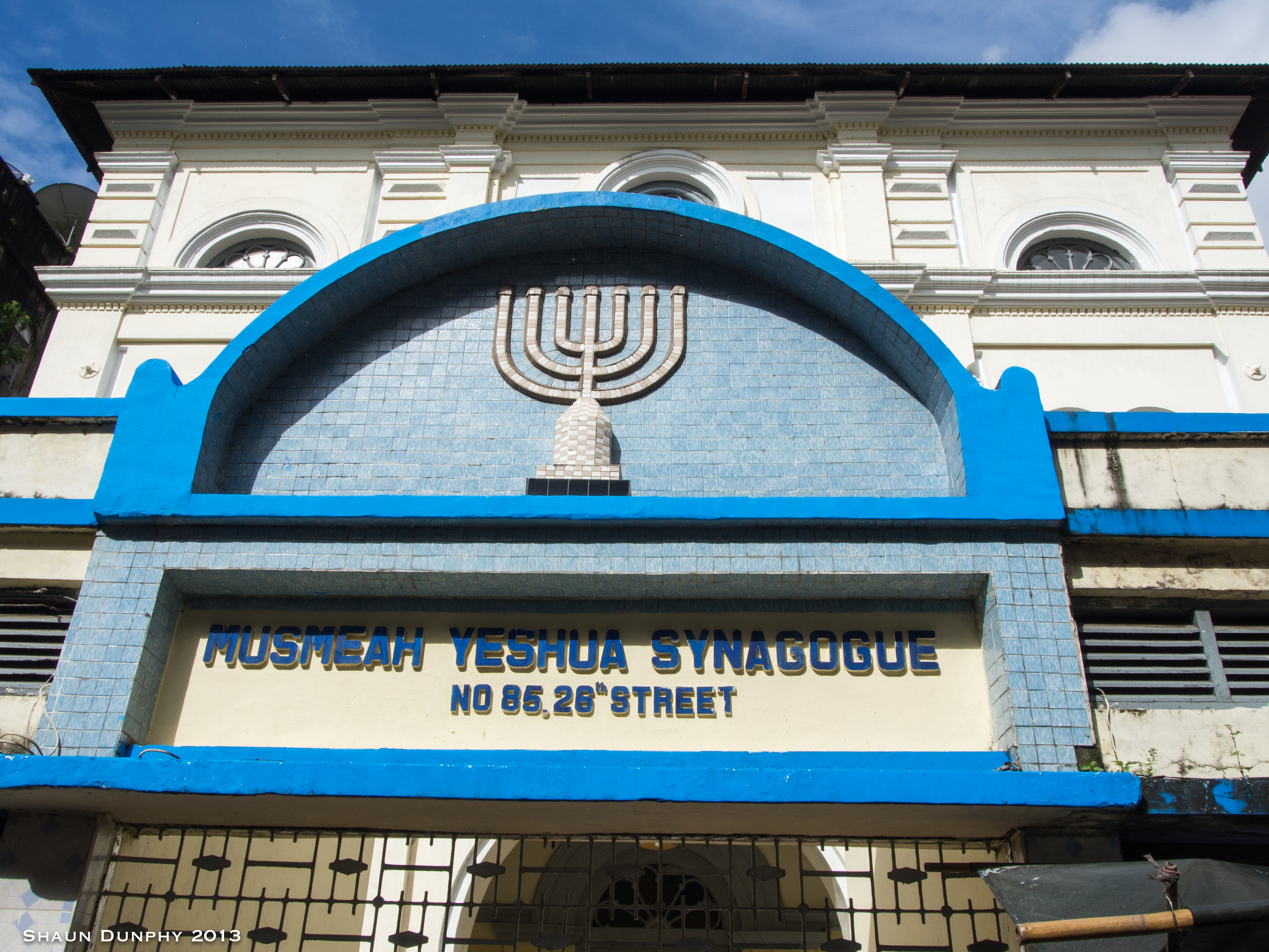
The frontispiece

== See also ==
- History of the Jews in Myanmar
- List of synagogues in Asia
