= Myint Aye =

Burmese activist (born 1950)

- Born: 1950 (age 75–76)
- Occupation: democracy activist
- Organization(s): National League for Democracy; Human Rights Defenders and Promoters
- Spouse: La La Win

Myint Aye (born 1950) is a Burmese democracy activist. In 2002, he co-founded the Human Rights Defenders and Promoters network in Burma. After several imprisonments on charges related to his activism, on 29 November 2008, he was given a life sentence for allegedly planning a bomb attack in Yangon's Shwepyitha Township. Amnesty International described the evidence against him as "fabricated" and designated him a prisoner of conscience. He was released from prison on 19 November 2012, as a gesture of goodwill before a visit by US President Barack Obama.

== Background ==
Myint Aye is an alumnus of the University of Foreign Languages, Yangon. While there in 1989, he married Daw La La Win.

== Democracy activism ==
Myint Aye has been arrested at least seven times, in 1998, 2000, 2003, 2006 and 2007. In 2002, Myint Aye co-founded the Human Rights Defenders and Promoters (HRDP) network in Burma. He was also active with the opposition party of Aung San Suu Kyi, the National League for Democracy, serving as its Yangon vice chairman. According to the Assistance Association for Political Prisoners, he was dismissed from the NLD in 2005 "for not following the party principles", but remained active with the HRDP.

Myint Aye was arrested in 2006 for calling for the release of leaders of the 88 Generation Students Group, but was released within weeks; he attributes the swift release to international pressure from groups like Amnesty and Front Line.

== 2008 life sentence ==
Myint Aye was active in bringing aid to Cyclone Nargis survivors in 2008. He was arrested on 8 August following a search of his home; police reportedly removed him from his father-in-law's home with a black hood over his head. Initially charged with "misappropriating relief funds", Myint Aye was later charged with participating in a bomb attack the previous month in Shwepyitha Township. Activists alleged he was tortured while in detention, and Amnesty stated that his trial "fell far short of international fair trial standards". On 29 November 2008, he was sentenced to "life imprisonment plus eight years", which he is serving in Loikaw prison.

Myint Aye's sentence was protested by several international human rights organizations. The member organizations of the International Freedom of Expression Exchange called the sentencings of Myint Aye, Zarganar, and others a "historical low point" in Burmese free expression and "a clear message that the junta will not tolerate opposition in the lead-up to their alleged 'democratic' 2010 elections." Front Line stated after his arrest that he appeared to be "targeted as a result of his human rights activities, in particular his work to uphold democracy". Amnesty named him a prisoner of conscience and in August 2012, selected his case to highlight at the annual Edinburgh Festival.

== Release ==
On 19 November 2012, U Myint Aye was released just ahead of a visit by US President Barack Obama. Reuters described the move as "clearly timed to show goodwill."
