= Religion in Myanmar =

Religion in Myanmar (2024 census)
1. Buddhism (91.3%)
2. Christianity (4.60%)
3. Islam (3.30%)
4. Hinduism (0.60%)
5. Other / None (0.20%)

Myanmar (formerly Burma) is a Buddhist majority country with a significant minority of Christians and other religious groups residing in the country.

Buddhism is a part of Myanmar culture. Section 361 of the Constitution states that "The Union recognizes the special position of Buddhism as the faith professed by the great majority of the citizens of the Union." According to the 2024 census of the Burmese government Buddhism is the dominant religion, of 91.3% of the population, practised especially by the Bamar, Rakhine, Shan, Mon and Chinese ethnic groups. Bamar people also practise the Burmese folk religion under the name of Buddhism. The 2008 constitution provides for the freedom of religion; however, it also grants broad exceptions that allow the regime to restrict these rights at will.

Ethnic minorities practise Christianity (4.6%, particularly the Chin, Kachin and Karen people), Islam (3.3%, particularly the Rohingya, Malay, Burmese Chinese and Burmese Indians), and Hinduism (0.6%, particularly by Burmese Indians).

Nat worship is common in Myanmar. Nats are named spirits and shrines can be seen around the country, either standing alone, or as part of Buddhist temples. Nat worship has a relationship with Myanmar Buddhism and there is a recognised pantheon of 37 nats.

== Census statistics ==
Note: the figures of Burma's Muslim population is divided into two. One that exclude non-citizens like Rohingyas who are ordinary residents and the other that includes them. In latter, the Muslim population will only be as low as 2.3% of the whole population of Burma, according to the census conducted by the Burmese Government.

The 2024 census was criticised for covering a lower number of areas than the preceding 2014 census. This necessitated a more frequent use of statistical estimates.

	Buddhist	Christian	Muslim	Hindu	Tribal religions	Other religions	Not religious
1973	88.8%	4.6%	3.9%	0.4%	2.2%	0.1%	—N/a
1983	89.4%	4.9%	3.9%	0.5%	1.2%	0.1%	—N/a
2014 (Note: Based on official figures where differences in the estimated overall population between enumerated and non-enumerated population (51,486,253) within Rakhine State is assumed to affiliate with the Islamic faith.)	87.9%	6.2%	4.3%	0.5%	0.8%	0.2%	0.1%
2024 (Note: Not all areas were included, as only 32,183,599 people were counted. Areas excluded may contain non-Buddhist populations.)	91.3%	4.6%	3.3%	0.6%	0.2%	0.0%	0.0%

=== Religion by state / region ===
Buddhism is the majority religion in all Regions and Kayin State, Kachin State, Mon State, Shan State and Kayah State. Most Bamar, Shan, Mon, Rakhine, Karen and many other ethnic groups of Myanmar follow Theravada Buddhism. Some Chinese people people follow Mahayana Buddhism. Christianity is the majority religion in Chin State and there are significant Christian populations in Kachin State and Kayah State. Most Chin, Kachin and Karenni people follow Christianity. Rakhine State has the largest Muslim population within Myanmar, mostly practised by the Rohingya and Kamein people.

Religion by State/Region in Myanmar in 2014
State/Region	Buddhism		Christianity		Islam		Animism		Hinduism		Other religions		No religion		Not stated		Total
State/Region	num.	%	num.	%	num.	%	num.	%	num.	%	num.	%	num.	%	num.	%	Total
Ayeyarwady Region	5,699,665	92.2%	388,348	6.3%	84,073	1.4%	459	0%	5,440	0.1%	6,600	0.1%	244	0%	0	0%	6,184,829
Bago Region	4,550,698	93.5%	142,528	2.9%	56,753	1.2%	4,296	0.1%	100,166	2.1%	12,687	0.3%	245	0%	0	0%	4,867,373
Chin State	62,079	13%	408,730	85.4%	690	0.1%	1,830	0.4%	106	0%	5,292	1.1%	74	0%	0	0%	478,801
Kachin State	1,050,610	62.2%	555,037	32.9%	26,789	1.6%	3,972	0.2%	5,738	0.3%	474	0%	221	0%	46,600	2.8%	1,689,441
Kayah State	142,896	49.9%	131,237	45.8%	3,197	1.1%	5,518	1.9%	269	0.1%	3,451	1.2%	59	0%	0	0%	286,627
Kayin State	1,271,766	80.8%	142,875	9.1%	68,459	4.3%	1,340	0.1%	9,585	0.6%	10,194	0.6%	107	0%	69,753	4.4%	1,574,079
Magway Region	3,870,316	98.8%	27,015	0.7%	12,311	0.3%	3,353	0.1%	2,318	0.1%	1,467	0%	275	0%	0	0%	3,917,055
Mandalay Region	5,898,160	95.7%	65,061	1.1%	187,785	3%	188	0%	11,689	0.2%	2,301	0%	539	0%	0	0%	6,165,723
Mon State	1,901,667	92.6%	10,791	0.5%	119,086	5.8%	109	0%	21,076	1%	1,523	0.1%	141	0%	0	0%	2,054,393
Nay Pyi Taw	1,123,036	96.8%	12,293	1.1%	24,030	2.1%	20	0%	516	0%	286	0%	61	0%	0	0%	1,160,242
Rakhine State	2,019,370	63.3%	36,791	1.2%	1,118,731	35.1%	2,711	0.1%	9,791	0.3%	759	0%	654	0%	0	0%	3,188,807
Sagaing Region	4,909,960	92.2%	349,377	6.6%	58,987	1.1%	89	0%	2,793	0.1%	2,928	0.1%	1,213	0%	0	0%	5,325,347
Shan State	4,755,834	81.7%	569,389	9.8%	58,918	1%	383,072	6.6%	5,416	0.1%	27,036	0.5%	24,767	0.4%	0	0%	5,824,432
Tanintharyi Region	1,231,719	87.5%	100,758	7.2%	72,074	5.1%	576	0%	2,386	0.2%	567	0%	321	0%	0	0%	1,408,401
Yangon Region	6,697,673	91%	232,249	3.2%	345,612	4.7%	512	0%	75,474	1%	7,260	0.1%	1,923	0%	0	0%	7,360,702

== Religions ==
=== Buddhism ===
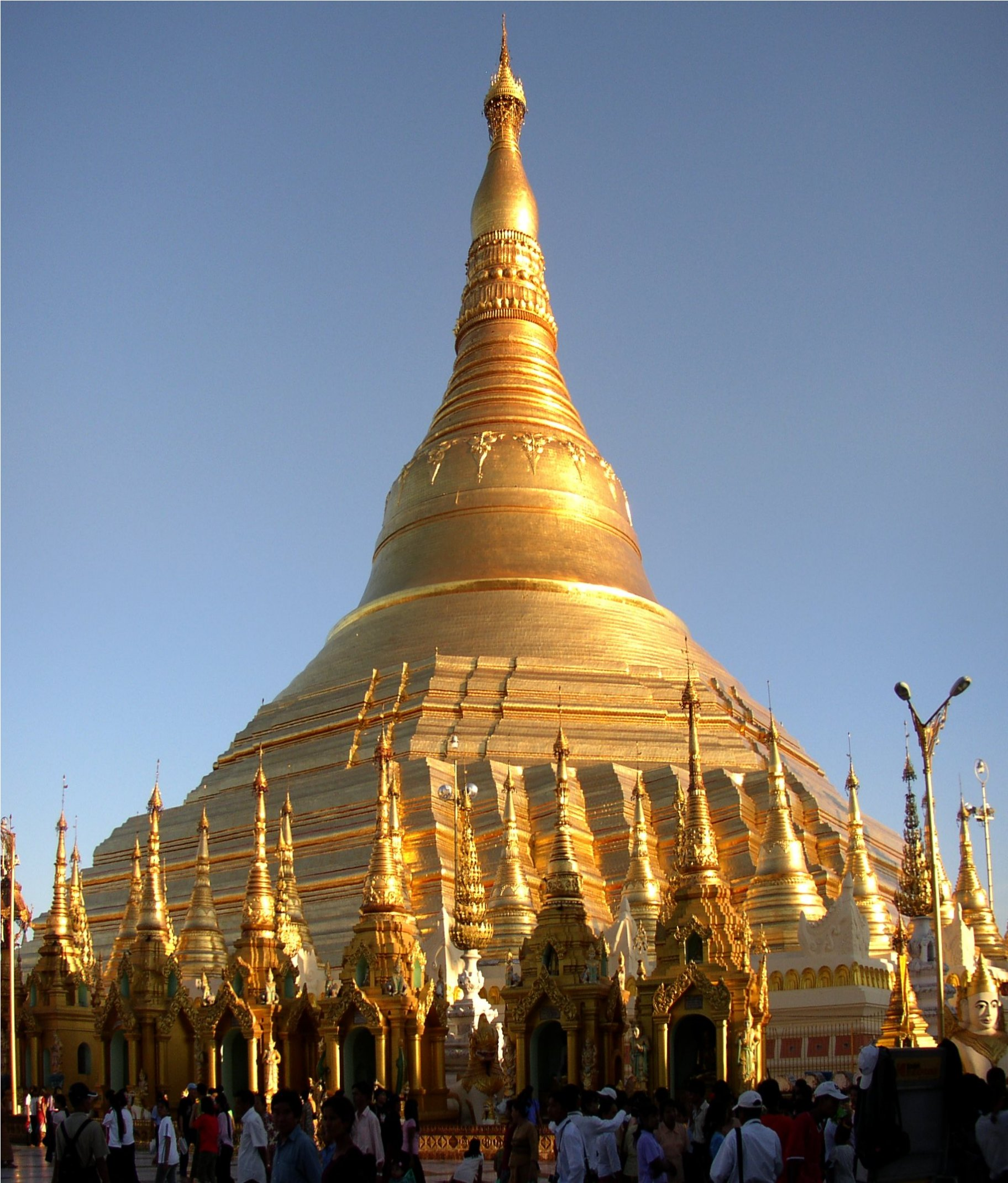
Shwedagon Pagoda in Yangon - the most revered pagoda in Myanmar

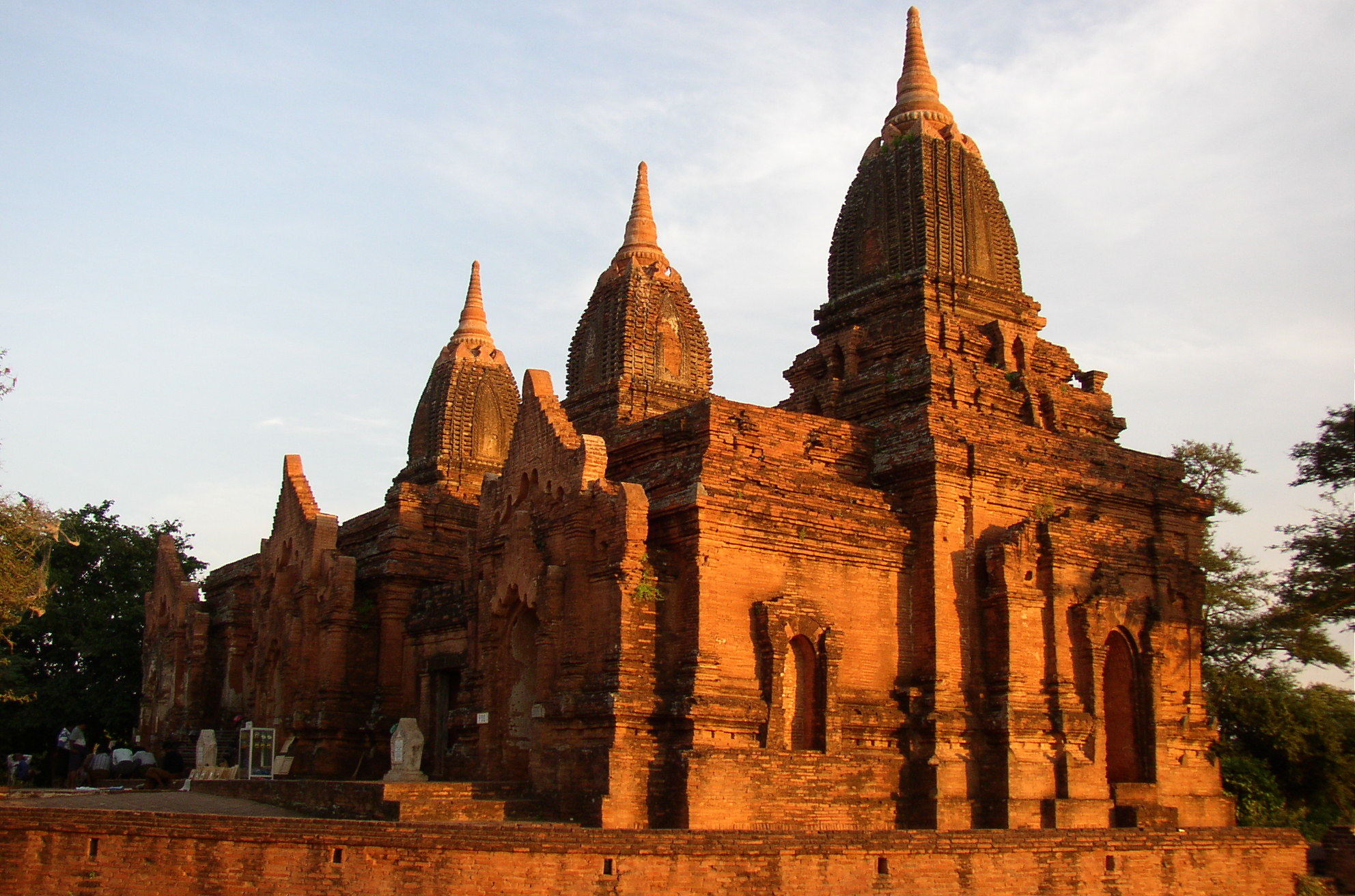
The Payathonzu Temple is built in the Mon style.

Buddhism in Myanmar is predominantly of the Theravada tradition, practised by about 90% of the country's population. It is the most religious Buddhist country in terms of the proportion of monks in the population and proportion of income spent on religion.

Adherents are most likely found among the dominant ethnic Bamar, Shan, Rakhine, Mon, Karen, and Chinese who are well integrated into Burmese society. Monks, collectively known as the Sangha, are venerated members of Burmese society. Among many ethnic groups in Myanmar, including the Bamar and Shan, Theravada Buddhism is practised in conjunction monastic orders (not to be confused with Nikaya Buddhism) with the most notable being the Thudhamma Nikaya accounting for 87% of Theravada monks. Mahayana Buddhism is practised less commonly today, often among Chinese. However, Ari Buddhism, a form of Buddhism more related to the Mahayana or tantric traditions, was the dominant Buddhist tradition prior to the 11th century in Upper Myanmar.

Buddhism in Myanmar dates back to at least the third century from contact between what is believed to be the Mon people of Lower Myanmar and Southern Indian kings in Nagarjunakonda. and Tambapamnidipa". Legends and historical accounts written centuries after the fact claim contact as far back as the lifetime of the Buddha, particularly in the traditional account of the construction of Shwedagon Pagoda 2500 years ago. The early Mon and Pyu became flourishing centers of Buddhism in contact with Southern India and Sri Lanka In the 11th century, the Bagan king Anawrahta converted to Theravada Buddhism after his conquests of the region driving out Ari Buddhism and incorporating traditional nats into the new Theravada sect that would become a solid part of Burmese history and culture.

Buddhists, although clearly professed by the majority of people in Myanmar, have their complaints regarding religious freedom. In 1961, Prime Minister U Nu made Buddhism the state religion and caused dissent amongst Christian Kachin nationalists and was one of the main factors for the Kachin conflict. In 1962, following Ne Win's coup d'état, this policy and other policies promoting Buddhism were reversed.

A political party, the Democratic Karen Buddhist Army, split from the main Karen nationalist movement, the Karen National Union (KNU), after the Buddhists were denied to rebuild and repair the stupas at Manerplaw. The top leadership of the KNU were also dominated by Christians, although roughly 65% of the Karen are Buddhist.

Many monks took part in the 2007 Saffron Revolution and were reportedly arrested by government security forces.

Buddhism is the fastest growing religion and majority religion in Myanmar. However, all data about religious demographics is difficult. Although many must list their religion on government forms and identification documents, the number of adherents varies widely from source to source. The constitution provides for freedom of religion but the government imposes restrictions on other religions and grants special preferences towards Buddhism. The Department for the Perpetuation and Propagation of the Sasana and state-sponsored State Sangha Maha Nayaka Committee support and regulate Buddhism in the country. The Committee has the power to disrobe monks who have violated its decrees and edicts as well as Vinaya regulations and laws, and expel monks from their resident monasteries. There is also a deep, mutually legitimising historical relationship between the state and the Sangha (monkhood) with long held inseparability of Buddhism and politics within the country.

=== Christianity ===
Christianity is practised by 6.2% of the population, primarily among the Kachin, Chin and Karen people, and Eurasians because of missionary work in their respective areas. About four-fifths of the country's Christians are Protestants, in particular Baptists of the Myanmar Baptist Convention; Roman Catholics make up the remainder.

=== Islam ===
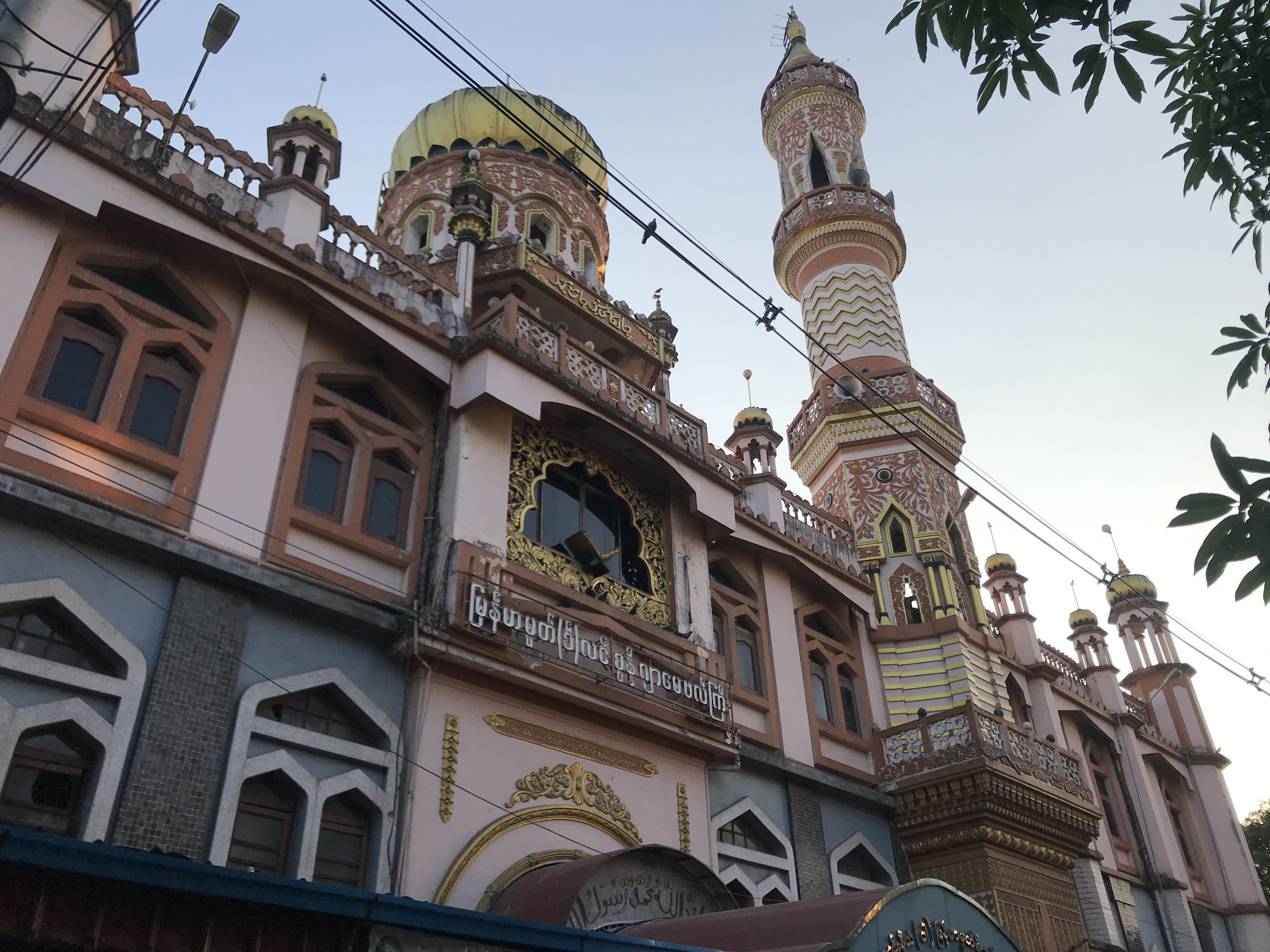
A mosque in Tamwe Township, Yangon

Islam, mainly of the Sunni sect, is practised by 2.3% of the population according to the 2014 Myanmar census. The Muslim population faces religious persecution in Myanmar.

Muslims in Myanmar largely fall into the following main groups:

Main groups

- Zerbadi Muslims, descendent community of intermarriages between South Asian males and Bamar females. They are the largest Muslim group in Myanmar and form more than half of the total Muslim population in the country.
- Indian-descended Muslims, largely immigrates from British India who live mainly in Yangon and Mandalay.
- Rohingyas, an ethnic minority group in northern Rakhine State, mostly concentrated in five Maungdaw, Buthidaung, Rathedaung, Sittwe and Kyauktaw townships.
- Panthay, Burmese Chinese Muslims and descendants of Chinese Hui people
- Kamein people, an ethnic minority in Rakhine State.
- Burmese Malays, largely in Kawthaung. People of Malay ancestry are locally called Pashu regardless of religion.
- Persians, Arabs and various other smaller groups.

The first Muslims in Myanmar date to early merchants during the Bagan period. The First Mongol invasion of Burma in the 13th century and the relationship of the Mrauk U Kingdom with the Bengal Sultanate are examples of prominent Muslim presence in Myanmar with Muslims ranging from traders and settlers to positions of status as royal advisors and port authorities.

The colonial period saw substantial immigration leading to various riots and anti-Muslim sentiment growing out of more general anti-Indian and anti-colonial sentiment. Post-independence, Muslims generally became increasingly seen as unwelcome foreign elements regardless of their ethnic origin or cultural attitudes.

In 1982, the government introduced regulations that denied citizenship to anyone who could not prove Burmese ancestry from before 1823. This disenfranchised many Muslims in Myanmar, even though they had lived in Myanmar for several generations.

Anti-Muslim riots became increasingly common in the early 21st century. The 2013 Myanmar anti-Muslim riots further inflamed tensions. The Rohingya people are a large Muslim group in Myanmar; the Rohingyas have been among the most persecuted group under Myanmar's military regime. The UN states that the Rohingyas are one of the most persecuted groups in the world. In 2016, the military of Myanmar conducted military operations with widespread human rights abuses during the Rohingya genocide which was charactersied by the United Nations as ethnic cleansing.

=== Hinduism ===
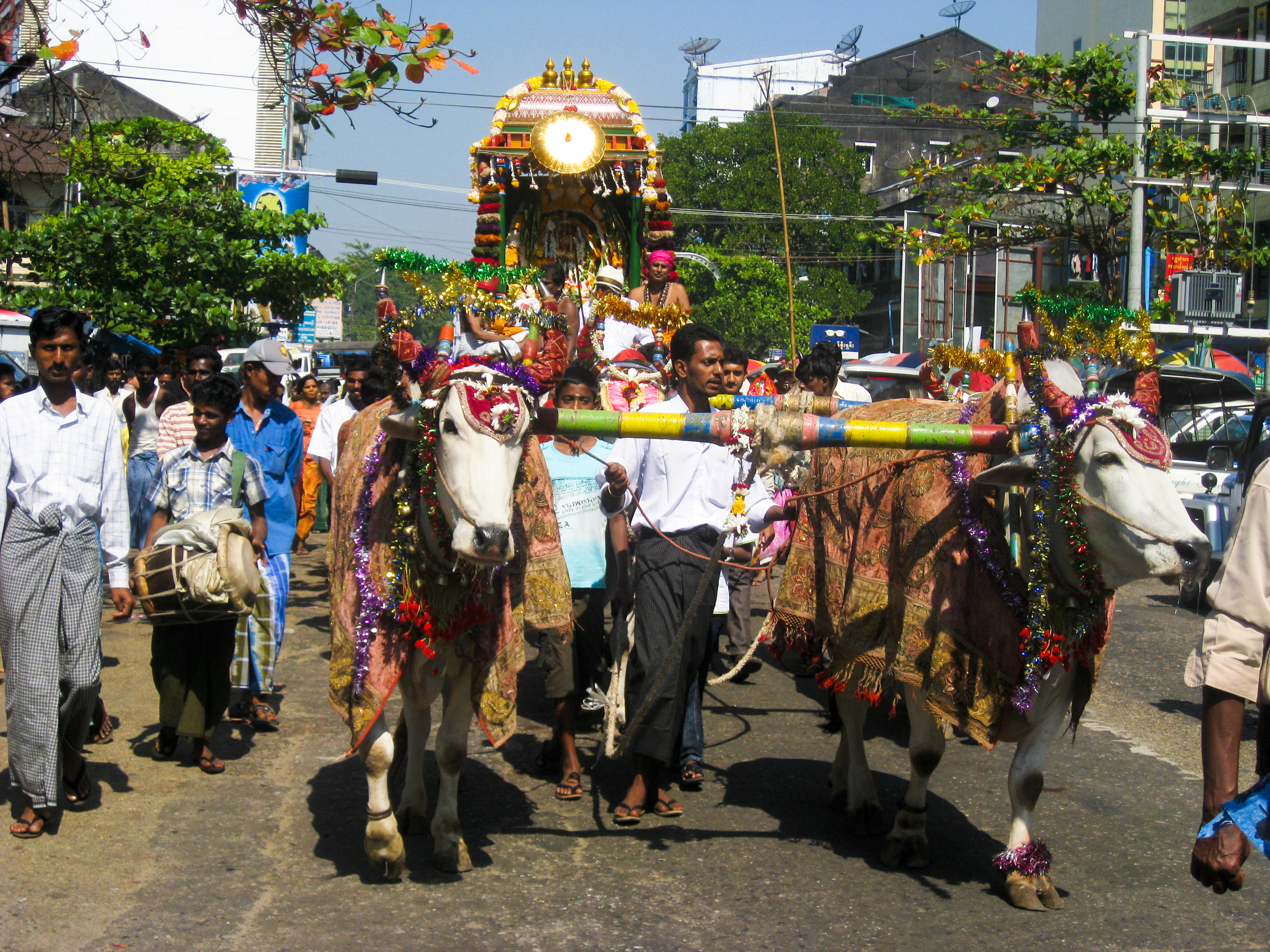
A Hindu procession in Yangon, Myanmar

Hinduism is the fourth-largest religion in Myanmar, being practised by 1.7% of the population of Myanmar in 2020.

Hinduism was predominantly pervasive in Burma during ancient times, declining after Buddhism was introduced. The name Burma derives from the first half of "Brahma Desha" the ancient name of the region. Hinduism greatly influenced the royal court of Burmese kings, the architecture of cities such as Bagan, and the Burmese language. In the colonial era, Hindu workers were brought in by British colonial government to serve in plantations and mines. According to 1931 census, 55% of Rangoon's (Yangon) population were Indian migrants, mostly Hindus.

After independence from Britain, the dictator Ne Win adopted xenophobic policies and expelled 300,000 Indian ethnic people, including many Hindus, from Burma between 1963 and 1967. The Indian policy of encouraging democratic protests in Burma increased persecution of Hindus, as well as led to Burmese retaliatory support of left-leaning rebel groups in northeastern states of India. Hindus in Myanmar have faced growing, organized discrimination under the military junta following the 2021 Myanmar coup d'état.

Historical Hindu practises and festivals remain common in Burma today, even in the majority Buddhist culture. For example, the nat Thagyamin has origins in the Hindu god Indra. Burmese literature has also been enriched by Hinduism, including the Burmese adaptation of the Ramayana, called Yama Zatdaw.

Predominantly, Burmese Indians make up Myanmar's population of Hindus. The practise of Hinduism among Burmese Indians is also influenced by Buddhism, such as housing images of the Buddha in Hindu temples. Other significant groups in Myanmar include Nepali-speaking Burmese Gurkha and a small minority of Bengali Hindus.

=== Judaism ===
Although Myanmar's Jews once numbered in the thousands, there are currently a few dozen Jews in Yangon (Rangoon), where the country's only synagogue is located. The Musmeah Yeshua Synagogue serves the dozen families left as well as Jewish tourists and foreign workers, but not many show up for daily minyan. Most Jews left Myanmar at the commencement of the Second World War, and most of the Jews who remained in Myanmar after World War II ended in 1945 left the country after General Ne Win took it over in 1962.

As of 2023, the Pabedan Township administration recognises the synagogue as a religious building within the township but reported zero Jews or followers of "Other" religions in its population count.

== Freedom of religion ==
Religion is highly regulated in Myanmar, often as Buddhism is used as an instrument to legitimise the state. The government regulates "deviant" Buddhist sects through the State Samgha Maha Nayaka Committee. Political scientist Robert Sterken argues that the state's use of Buddhist kingship ideals to further its political survival corrupts the "religious marketplace" repressing both the majority Buddhist population and ethnic minorities by undermining the role of genuine Buddhist faith in Burmese society.

In March 2023, Christian Solidarity Worldwide noted the arrests of 20,000 people since the coup, the displacement of 1.3 million people and the destruction of churches, temples and mosques.

In 2026, Freedom House scored the country 1 out of 4 for religious freedom in its Freedom in the World report.

In 2026, the country was ranked as the 14th worst place in the world to be a Christian. Christian minorities are targeted and disproportionately affected by the ongoing Myanmar civil war. Particularly, this targeted violence is worst in Christian-majority Chin State where many Christians are forced to flee into neighboring countries, particularly to Northeastern India.

== See also ==
- Irreligion in Myanmar
- Burmese folk religion
