= Human Rights Defenders and Promoters =

Burmese organisation

Human Rights Defenders and Promoters was formed in 2002 in Burma to raise awareness among the people of Burma about their human rights and help them conduct advocacy.

According to Human Rights Defenders and Promoters (HRDP), on April 18, 2007, several of its members (U Myint Aye, Maung Maung Lay, Tin Maung Oo and Yin Kyi) were attacked by approximately a hundred people under the direction of U Nyunt Oo - Secretary of the Union Solidarity and Development Association (USDA). Myint Hlaing and Maung Maung Lay were badly injured and are now hospitalized. The HRDP believes that this attack was condoned by the authorities and vows to take legal action.

The Burmese military government stated its intention to crack down on these human rights activists, according to an April 23, 2007, report in the country's official press. The announcement, that comprised a full page of the official newspaper, followed calls by human rights advocacy groups, including London-based Amnesty International, for Burmese authorities to investigate recent violent attacks on rights activists in the country.

Two members of Human Rights Defenders and Promoters, Maung Maung Lay, 37, and Myint Naing, 40, were hospitalized with head injuries following attacks by more than 50 people while the two were working in Hinthada township, Irrawaddy Division in mid-April. On Sunday, April 22, 2007, eight people were arrested by plainclothes police, members of the pro-junta Union Solidarity and Development Association, and the Pyithu Swan Arr Shin (a paramilitary group) while demonstrating peacefully in a Rangoon suburb. The eight protesters were calling for lower commodity prices, better health-care and improved utility services. Htin Kyaw, 44, one of the eight who also took part in an earlier demonstration in late February in downtown Rangoon, was beaten by a mob, according to sources at the scene of the protest.

Reports from Burmese opposition activists have emerged in recent weeks saying that Burmese authorities have directed the police and other government proxy groups to deal harshly with any sign of unrest in Rangoon. "This proves that there is no rule of law [in Burma]," the 88 Generation Students group said in a statement issued on April 23, 2007. "We seriously urge the authorities to prevent violence in the future and to guarantee the safety of every citizen."

Group co-founder Myint Aye, imprisoned on a life sentence in 2008, was selected by Amnesty International in 2012 as their case to promote at the annual Edinburgh Festival.
