= International rankings of Myanmar =

The following are international rankings of Myanmar (Burma).

== Demographics ==
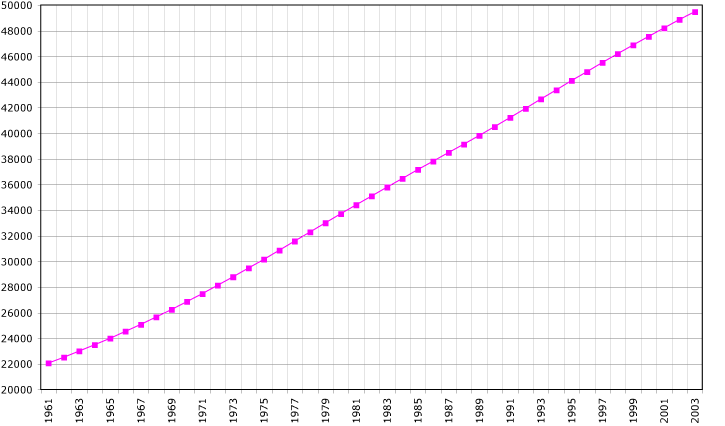
Demographics of Myanmar, (FAO 2009); Number of inhabitants in thousands

- Population: 29/195 (2025)
- Population density: 131/244 (2025)
- Total fertility rate: 148/223 (1.89)
- Death rate:
  - CIA World Factbook: 114/225 (2023)
  - United Nations: 69/195

== Economy ==
- GDP per capita: 208/227
- Nominal GDP:
  - International Monetary Fund (2009): 86/181
  - CIA World Factbook (2009): 89/190
- GDP (nominal) per capita:
  - International Monetary Fund: 165/180
  - CIA World Factbook: 166/191
- GDP (PPP) (2009):
  - International Monetary Fund: 78/180
  - CIA World Factbook: 83/193
- GDP (PPP) per capita:
  - International Monetary Fund: 161/181
  - CIA World Factbook: 175/194
- Real GDP growth rate: 82/213
- External debt (2002): 123/202
- Foreign exchange reserves: 93/156
- Index of Economic Freedom (2010): 175/179
- Economic Freedom of the World rankings (2009): 140/141
- Trade Openness by country: 119/167

== Energy ==
- Oil consumption: 119/208
- Oil imports: 104/206

== Environment ==
- Environmental Performance Index (2010): 110/163
- Happy Planet Index (2009): 39/143

== Globalization ==
- KOF Globalization Index (2010): 180/203
- Trade-to-GDP Ratio: 105/179

== Geography ==
- Total area: 40/231

== Health ==
- Cigarette consumption per capita (2007): 105/121
- Life expectancy (2009):
  - CIA World Factbook: 171/223
  - United Nations: 148/194
- HIV/AIDS adult prevalence rate: 22/160
- HIV/AIDS death rate: 18/153
- Undernourishment levels: 44/76
- Infant mortality rate:
  - CIA World Factbook: 172/224
  - United Nations: 158/195
- WHO Total health expenditure (PPP) per capita: 189/194
- Child Development Index (2000-2006): 93/137
- Overall health system performance: 190/191

== Military ==
- Total number of troops: 24/172
- Number of active troops per 1000 capita: 22/172
- Global Peace Index (2010): 132/149

== Politics and governance ==
- Democracy Index (2018): 118/167
- Failed States Index: 16/37
- Reporters Without Borders Press Freedom Index (2009): 171/175
- Global Press Freedom Rankings (2009): 193/195 (39/40 in Asia-Pacific)
- Corruption Perceptions Index (2009): 178/180
- Composite Index of National Capability (2007): 30/193
- KOF Globalisation Index: Political Dimension (2019): 139/203
- KOF Globalisation Index: Social Dimension (2019): 187/203
- KOF Globalisation Index: Economic Dimension (2019): 163/203
- KOF Globalisation Index (2019): 180/203

== Society ==
- Caux Round Table Social Achievement Capital 2009: 166/199
- Education Index: 120/179
- Education expenditures: 178/182
- World Giving Index (2014): 1/153
- Population of Buddhists: 5th in the world
- Proportion of Buddhists: 3rd in the world
- Human Development Index (2007): 138/182
- Satisfaction with Life Index (2006): 130/178
- World Happiness Report: 131/156

== Technology ==
- Brown University Taubman Center for Public Policy e-Governance (2006): 119/198
- Number of mobile phones in use: 163/222
- Number of Internet users: 148/195
- Out of 967 languages, supported by Unicode, Myanmar was the last country which start using Unicode officially in 2019.
- World Intellectual Property Organization: Global Innovation Index 2026, ranked 125 out of 139 countries

== Transportation ==
- Vehicles per capita: 121/143
