= Mon Taing Pin massacre =

2022 mass killing in Sagaing Region, Myanmar

Mondaingbin massacre
- Part of the 2021 Myanmar coup d'état and the Myanmar civil war (2021–present)
- A photo from May 11 shows the phone owner and another man standing next to five slain men lying in pools of blood.

- Site of massacre (Myanmar)
- Location: Mondaingbin, Sagaing Region
- Date: 11 May 2022
- Deaths: 37
- Perpetrators: State Administration Council; Myanmar Army
- Charges: None

The Mon Taing Pin massacre was a mass killing of civilians by Burmese military forces on 11 May 2022, in the village of Mondaingbin, Sagaing Region, Myanmar. During the massacre, Myanmar Army troops executed at least 37 villagers. Sagaing Region later became the site of several additional mass killings perpetrated by the Burmese military, including the Letyetkon and Tadaing massacres.

== Background ==
On 1 February 2021, the Myanmar Armed Forces staged a coup d'état and deposed the democratically elected government led by the National League for Democracy. Shortly thereafter, the military established a junta, the State Administration Council (SAC), and declared a national state of emergency. In response, civilians throughout the country staged large-scale protests to resist the military takeover.

By May 2021, the civilian-led resistance had escalated into a civil war against the SAC, which was unwilling to compromise. Mondaingbin (Burmese: မုန်တိုင်ပင်, lit. 'cycad palm'; variously spelt Mon Taing Bin, Mone Taing Pin, or variations thereof) is situated in the traditional Bamar Buddhist heartland, which quickly emerged as a stronghold of resistance against military rule. Mondaingbin is a small village of 400 households and 1,900 individuals in Ye-U Township, located 39 miles (63 km) northwest of Shwebo.

Given the fierce resistance by locals in Sagaing Region, by November 2021, the Burmese military had begun launching airstrikes in the region to regain control, forcing thousands of villagers to flee. To suppress resistance, the Burmese army has employed a 'four cuts' strategy, to cut off resistance groups from access to food, financing, intelligence, and recruits, by denying humanitarian access to survivors, razing entire villages, and using indiscriminate airstrikes and artillery shelling. In December 2021, the Burmese army killed 11 villagers in the village of Dondaw, in neighbouring Salingyi Township. The following month, another 6 individuals were killed in the village of Thitseingyi in neighbouring Wetlet Township.

== Incident ==
On 10 May 2022, around 6:00, 150 to 200 soldiers shelled the village of Mondaingbin with heavy artillery, causing a total of 10,000 residents from 10 nearby villages to flee. Approximately 100 villagers who could not escape in time took refuge at the local Buddhist monastery. By 9:00, forces entered the monastery, where they tortured, interrogated, and detained the remaining villagers.

The following morning, around 6:00, army troops forced 10 young male villagers to carry army belongings to the Mu River. Afterwards, they were hacked with machetes and burned by forces. That afternoon, between 14:30 and 15:00, the remaining captives were rounded up and executed at Zeya Theikdi pagoda by gunshot. According to villagers, eight villagers were spared from execution after a Buddhist monk had intervened.

Troops departed to nearby Pontaka village at 2:00 the following day. The survivors, including 8 men, and 50 women and children, were subsequently released. After their release, survivors extinguished fires set by military forces throughout the village, and uncovered at least 29 charred bodies. A total of 94 buildings were destroyed during the attack. A few days after the massacre, villagers later found another 11 corpses in the nearby village of Einbin.

== Perpetrators ==
The massacre was carried out by Taikkyi-based troops from the 708 Light Infantry Battalion (LIB), under the command of Lieutenant Colonel Tun Lin Aung. Tun Lin Aung reports to Brigadier General Kyi Thaik, the head of the 4th Military Operations Command (MOC-4), which is based in Yangon. Kyi Thaik ultimately reports to Min Aung Hlaing, who also heads the military junta, the State Administration Council. Villagers also reported that members of a pro-military Pyusawhti militia had also helped carry out the raid.

== Victims ==
All victims were male, ranging from the ages of 25 to 64. Victims included Buddhist monks and three resistance fighters from the People's Defence Force. Several victims were found blindfolded, with their throats slit or with gunshot wounds, while others were charred, showing signs of murder. Several victims belonged to the National League for Democracy while others belonged to the military's proxy party, the Union Solidarity and Development Party.

== Aftermath ==
The following month, military troops killed an additional 6 civilians in the nearby village of Kanbya in neighbouring Myinmu Township.

Villagers in nearby Ayadaw Township later found the cell phone of a soldier involved in the massacre. The cell phone had documented photos and videos of the raid, including villagers detained at the monastery, and the remains of executed captives. The phone's cache also contained video footage of soldiers, including a sergeant, boasting of their kill counts, and the explaining various methods they had used to dismember bodies.

== Reactions ==
=== Domestic ===
On 24 May 2022, the opposition National Unity Government of Myanmar called for justice in response to the massacre. On 23 July, it released additional statistics from the massacre. The military junta's spokesman Zaw Min Tun initially dismissed the reported deaths, calling them "fabricated." He later acknowledged the military was investigating the incident.

=== International ===
In July 2022, Human Rights Watch called the massacre "gruesome" and "shocking" and called for UN member states to impose an arms embargo on the Burmese military, and to refer the situation to the International Criminal Court.

== See also ==
- 2021 Myanmar coup d'état
- Myanmar civil war (2021–present)
- List of massacres in Myanmar
