= Mondaingbin =

Village in Sagaing Region, Myanmar

Mondaingbin မုန်တိုင်ပင်
- Village
- Location in Myanmar (Burma)
- Coordinates: 22°53′00″N 95°27′25″E
- Country: Myanmar
- Region: Sagaing Region
- District: Ye-U District
- Township: Ye-U Township
- Village tract: Mondaingbin village tract
- Time zone: UTC+6.30 (MMT)

Mondaingbin (Burmese: မုန်တိုင်ပင်, lit. 'cycad palm') is a village in Ye-U Township, Sagaing Region, Myanmar and is the primary village in the Mondaingbin village tract. Mondaingbin is a small village of 400 households and 1,900 individuals in Ye-U Township, located 39 miles (63 km) northwest of Shwebo.

On 12 May 2022, Myanmar Army carried out a massacre of male civilians from the village.
