= US-ASEAN Business Council =

American advocacy group

US-ASEAN Business Council (USABC)
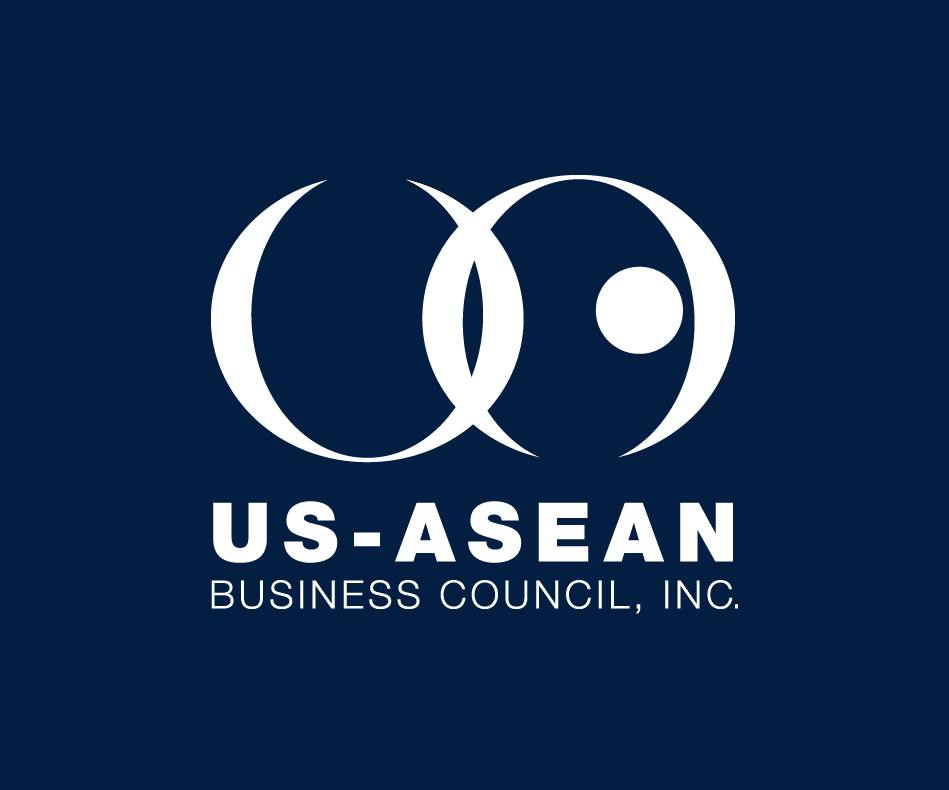
- Founded: 1984
- Headquarters: 1101 17th Street. NW, Washington, DC
- Key people: Brian D. McFeeters (President & CEO)
- Services: ASEAN Government Relations; Advocacy; Regional Assistance; Information Updates; Consulting; Corporate Social Responsibility
- Website: www.usasean.org

The US-ASEAN Business Council (also known as "USABC") is a non-profit advocacy group that aims to foster economic growth and trade ties between the United States and the Association of Southeast Asian Nations (ASEAN)'s eleven member countries. It is the only U.S.-based organization enshrined in the ASEAN charter. Headquartered in Washington, DC, the Council has offices in New York City, Indonesia, Malaysia, Philippines, Singapore, Thailand, and Vietnam. The Council represents more than 185 of the largest US corporations.

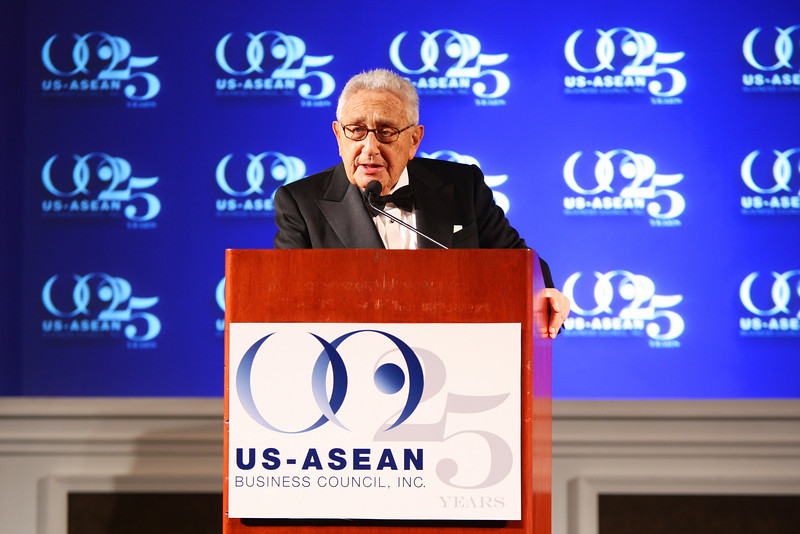
Former Secretary of State, Henry Kissinger, at the USABC 25th Anniversary.

== History ==
The Council was created in response to a request from the ASEAN governments at the ASEAN-US dialogue of 1984. First known as the "US-ASEAN Center for Technology Exchange," the Council's mission was to enhance trade and investment opportunities for US companies in ASEAN, and to increase the ASEAN countries' access to US sources of technology and training. President Ronald Reagan remarked on the Council's founding, "You are embarking on a most important and innovative private sector initiative to strengthen the United States presence and our competitiveness in Southeast Asia."

In 1989, The US-ASEAN Center for Technology Exchange absorbed the ASEAN-US Business Council that had been housed in the United States Chamber of Commerce since 1979. Following the merger, the Council took the name of the US-ASEAN Council for Business and Technology. The name changed to US-ASEAN Business Council in 1997. Since the Council's founding in 1984, there has been remarkable growth in trade between the United States and ASEAN, reaching US$198.5 billion in 2012.

== Industry committees ==
The Council's working group committees include all ten ASEAN nations, including industry portfolios: Customs & Trade Facilitation, Defense & Security, Energy, Financial Services, Food & Agriculture, Health and Life Sciences, Information & Communications Technology, Infrastructure, Manufacturing, and Travel & Tourism. Through these committees, the Council facilitate opportunities in varying market conditions. Its Financial Service Committee, for instance, is a participant of the annual ASEAN Finance Ministers' and Central Bank Governors' Meeting (AFMGM), thus giving the Council the capacity to raise and advocate member company concerns. The Council's Energy Committee, currently chaired by Chevron, represents specific industries ranging from geothermal, coal based methane, wind energy, oil, gas, natural resources and nuclear energy.

== Programs and events ==
The Council conducts several programs and events to promote mutual dialogue between US businesses and leading political figures of Southeast Asia. Programs include ASEAN Trade/Economic Ministers' and Ambassadors' Roadshows; annual Business Missions to Brunei, Cambodia, Indonesia, Laos, Malaysia, Myanmar, Philippines, Singapore, Thailand and Vietnam; presenting of the Council's Lifetime Achievement Award to Singapore's Minister Mentor and First Prime Minister Lee Kuan Yew; and dinner galas hosted in honour of foreign dignitaries, including former Myanmar President Thein Sein, President of the Philippines Benigno Aquino III, Malaysian Prime Minister Najib Razak and Vietnamese President Truong Tan Sang on each of their visits to the United States.

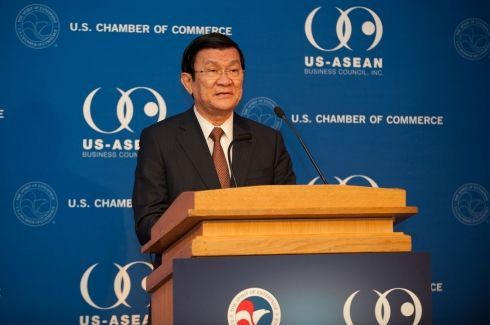
President of Vietnam, Truong Tan Sang speaks at a dinner gala co-hosted by the US-ASEAN Business Council and the United States Chamber of Commerce

== Membership ==
The Council membership includes over 185 leading US corporations across several business sectors. Members engage at either the Corporate or Chairman's Council level. Previous Chairs of the Council include Keith Williams, Chairman and CEO of UL LLC, Maurice Greenberg, Chairman and CEO of C.V. Starr and Co., Inc, Muhtar Kent, Chairman and CEO of The Coca-Cola Company, Roderick Hills, Chairman of Hills Companies and Charles Williamson, Chairman and CEO of Unocal Corporation.

== US-ASEAN Business Council Institute ==
A sister organisation of the Council, The US-ASEAN Business Council Institute is a 501(c)(3) charitable organisation primarily focused on humanitarian activities and community engagement. US-ASEAN Business Council Institute initiatives aim to improve the lives of people in Southeast Asia, and to provide support for programs that preserve and expand knowledge about the rich cultural and art heritage of the ASEAN region. Additionally, the Institute works on initiatives related to education, governance and rule of law, health, and the environment.
