= Irreligion in Myanmar =

Irreligion in Myanmar is uncommon and considered a social taboo, making it difficult to quantify the number of atheists and agnostics in Myanmar. Theravada Buddhism is part of the daily life for the majority of the country's residents; disbelief or being openly irreligious carries a significant amount of stigma. Myanmar's government does not officially recognize atheism, agnosticism, or irreligion as religious beliefs, which citizens are required to list on their citizenship scrutiny cards. Groups and organizations for atheists in Myanmar have grown significantly in recent years, such as the Burmese Atheists Association and the "Myanmar Atheists" Facebook group with around 29,000 members.

Of the 32,183,599 people surveyed in Myanmar's 2024 census, only 3,068 listed no religion. In 2014, 0.1% of Myanmar's population was non-religious.

== See also ==
- Religion in Myanmar
