= Fo Guang Buddhist Temple Boston =

- 佛光山波士頓三佛中心
- Location within Massachusetts Location within the United States

Religion
- Affiliation: Buddhism
- Sect: Fo Guang Shan

Location
- Location: 711 Concord Ave, Cambridge, MA 02138
- Country: United States
- Interactive map of Fo Guang Buddhist Temple Boston
- Coordinates: 42.391207°N 71.150839°W

Architecture
- Founder: Hsing Yun
- Established: 1990

Website
- http://www.fgsbtboston.org/en/home-en/

The Fo Guang Buddhist Temple of Boston (FGBTB) (Chinese: 佛光山波士頓三佛中心; pinyin: Fóguāng Shān Bōshìdùn Sān Fó Zhōngxīn) is a branch of the Fo Guang Shan international Chinese Mahāyāna Buddhist order. It is the first temple that Fo Guang Shan Temple established in Massachusetts.

In 1990 Ven. Hsin Ting and Hui Kai were invited by Boston Massachusetts Institute of Technology (MIT) to give Dharma talks and subsequently Venerable Hui Chuan was invited to give a talk on Humanistic Buddhism. In 1997, Venerable Master Hsing Yun, the founder of FGBT Boston gave a public talk in Billerica with more than 300 people attended and from there they established the Buddha's Light International Association Boston sub-chapter. In 1998 Fo Guang Shan Temple purchased a restaurant located on Massachusetts Avenue, Cambridge, in between Harvard University and the Massachusetts Institute of Technology, to propagate Dharma in Boston. This place was named as the Fo Guang Shan Triple Buddha's Center (also known as Greater Boston Buddhist Cultural Center (International Buddhist Progress Society)) which in Chinese means the “Harvard, Fo Guang Shan and Buddha's Light Center” and the opening ceremony was held on January 3, 1999. The center was operated as a teahouse and a bookstore, however, the center also includes all kind of interest classes including reading group, English meditation class, Children meditation class, and Dharma with Dinner session etc. The center services all range of local communities, especially the professors and students from Harvard University and MIT. The center also had many interactions with the local Buddhist communities and religious groups. Due to the growth of the members and also the limitation of the venue, in 2014 Fo Guang Buddhist Temple of Boston moved shifted to 711 Concord Ave, Cambridge, MA 01238.
