= Fo Guang Shan Monastery =

Monastery in Dashu, Kaohsiung, Taiwan

- 佛光山寺
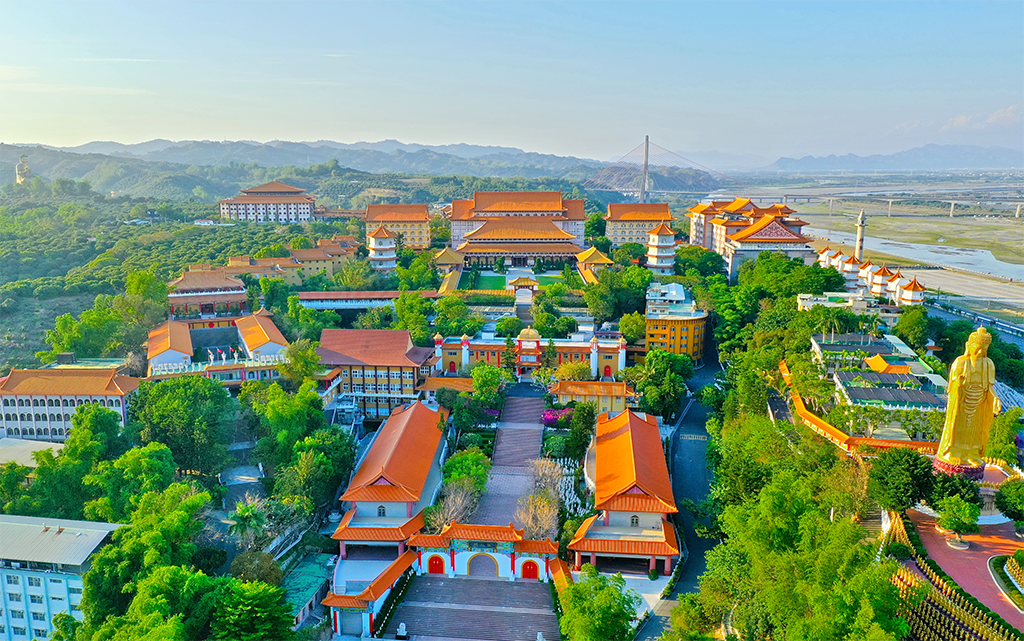
- Interactive map of Fo Guang Shan Monastery

Monastery information
- Order: Fo Guang Shan
- Established: 1967

People
- Founder: Hsing Yun
- Abbot: Hsin Bau

Site
- Location: 22.75708°N 120.44135°E
- Public access: Open to the public free of charge
- Website: www.fgs.org.tw/en

Fo Guang Shan Monastery (Chinese: 佛光山寺; pinyin: Fó Guāng Shān Sì; lit. Buddha's Light Mountain Monastery) is a Chinese Mahāyāna Buddhist monastery in Dashu District, Kaohsiung, Taiwan. It is the headquarters of the Fo Guang Shan international organization and the largest Buddhist monastery in Taiwan.

== History ==
In 1967, Hsing Yun purchased more than 30 hectares in Dashu Township, Kaohsiung County as the site for the construction of a monastery. The groundbreaking ceremony was held on 16 May 1967. Fo Guang Shan has undertaken many construction projects, including university buildings, shrines, and a cemetery. In 1975, Fo Guang Shan's 36-metre tall statue of Amitābha Buddha was consecrated. In 1981, 15 years after its establishment, the Great Hero Hall was built. During these times, many other Fo Guang Shan temples outside the order's mother monastery were also built.

In May 1997, Hsing Yun announced that he would close the mountain gate of Fo Guang Shan to the general public. His reason in closing the monastery was to give monastics the cloistered atmosphere they need for their Buddhist practice. In practice, many Chinese monasteries have also closed their mountain gates to give a cloistered atmosphere to the temple residents. At the end of 2000, then President Chen Shui-bian of the Republic of China and government officials from Kaohsiung visited Fo Guang Shan, bringing with them the wish from their constituents that Fo Guang Shan reopen its mountain gate. After due consideration, Fo Guang Shan decided to reopen the monastery to some extent, thereby providing the public a place to practice Pure Land Buddhism.

The monastery hosted the First International Dialogue for Buddhist and Christian Nuns from 14-19 October 2018. This conference, organised together with the Dicastery for Interreligious Dialogue, the DIMMID and several other organisations, brought together 70 Buddhist and Christian nuns under the theme of "Active Contemplation and Contemplation in Action".

== Campus ==
Fo Guang Shan's main shrine has an area of 3570 square meters, is 30 meters in height, and can house up to one thousand people. There are three statues of Buddhas, each 7.8 meters high. The Great Buddha is located on the eastern side of Fo Guang Shan next to the Great Wisdom Shrine. The Great Buddha is 36 meters in height, and is the highest standing Buddha in Southeast Asia. The interior four walls are filled with Dunhuang style stone niches enshrining 14800 more statues of Sakyamuni Buddha. The Great Compassion Shrine (Chinese: 大悲殿; pinyin: Dàbēi diàn) has an area of 800 square meters, is 6 meters high, and contains a 6-meter-high statue of Guan Yin.

The Patriarch Shrine (Chinese: 宗祖殿; pinyin: Zōngzǔ diàn) serves as a memorial hall for Hsing Yun and houses his archive of his written works, and is the final resting place for his relics. It also serves as the Sutra Repository (Chinese: 藏經樓; pinyin: Cáng jīng lóu) which houses over 50 copies of the Tripiṭaka.

The campus of the associated Fo Guang Shan Buddha Museum is just to the north of the monastery. The Big Buddha (Chinese: 佛光大佛; pinyin: Fóguāng dàfó) of the museum is located at the very back of the museum is made from 1,800 tons of metal and measures 40 meters tall.

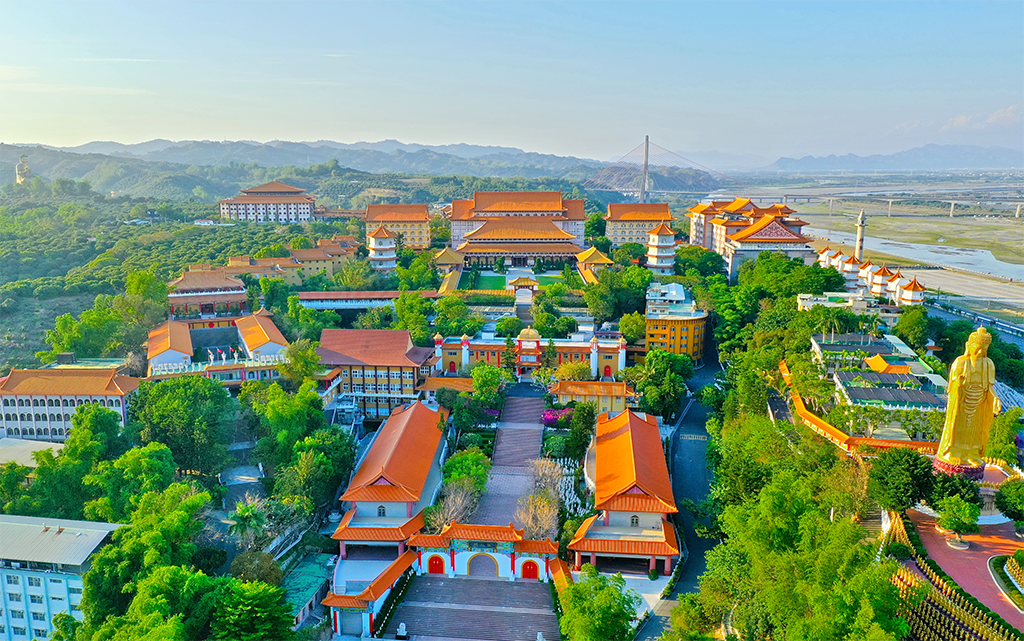
Aerial view of the Monastery

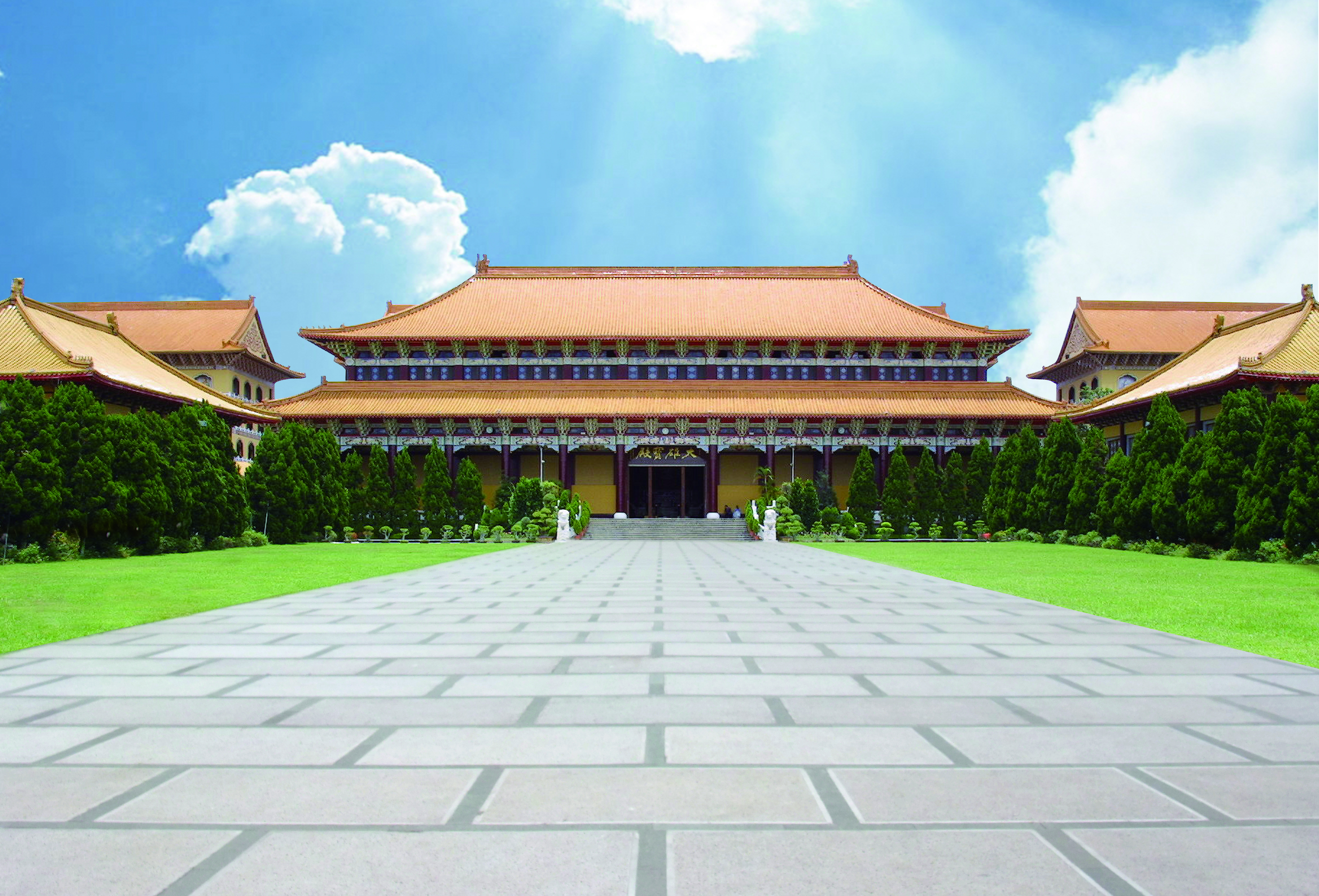
Main Shrine

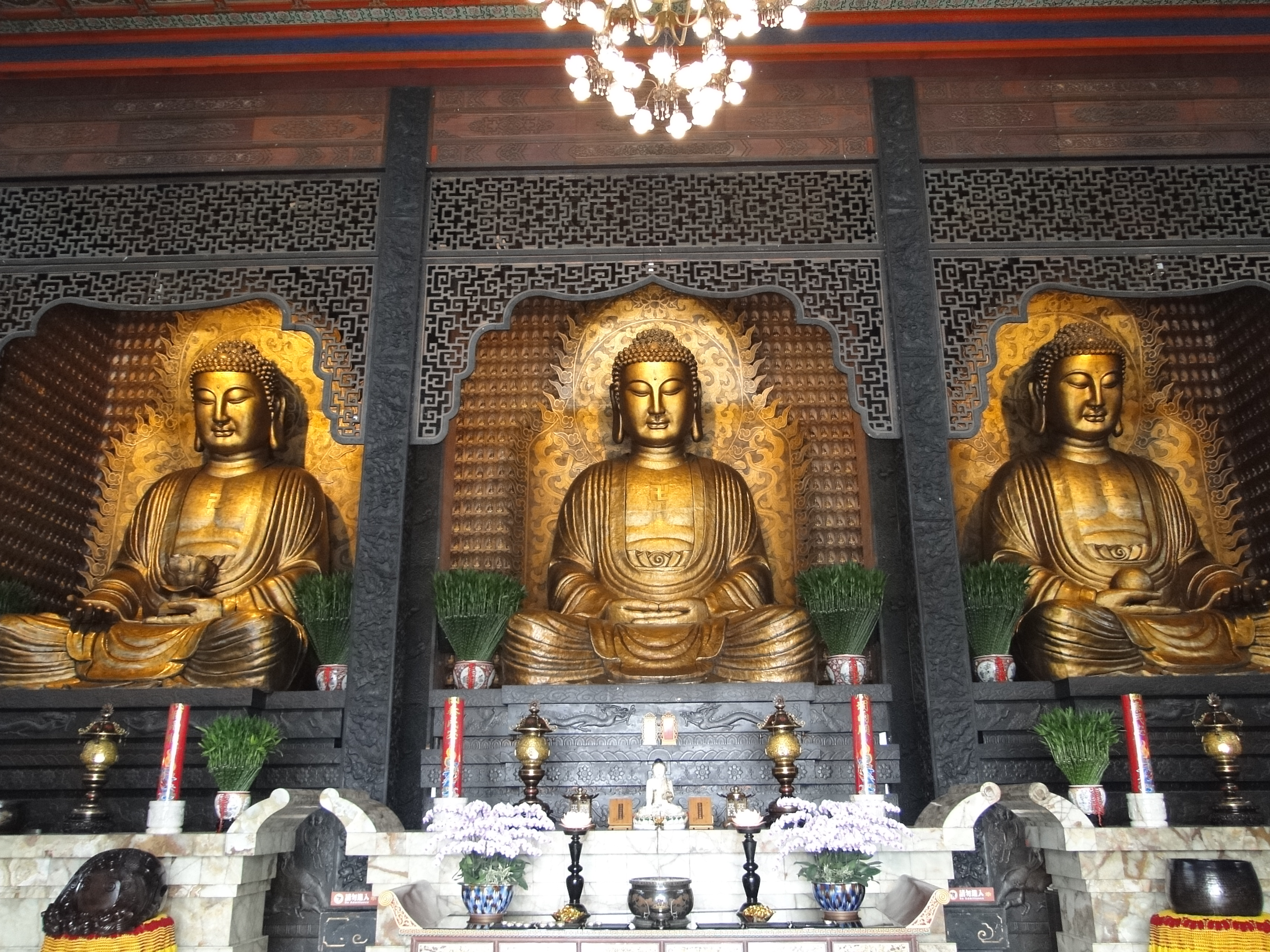
Buddha statues in the main shrine

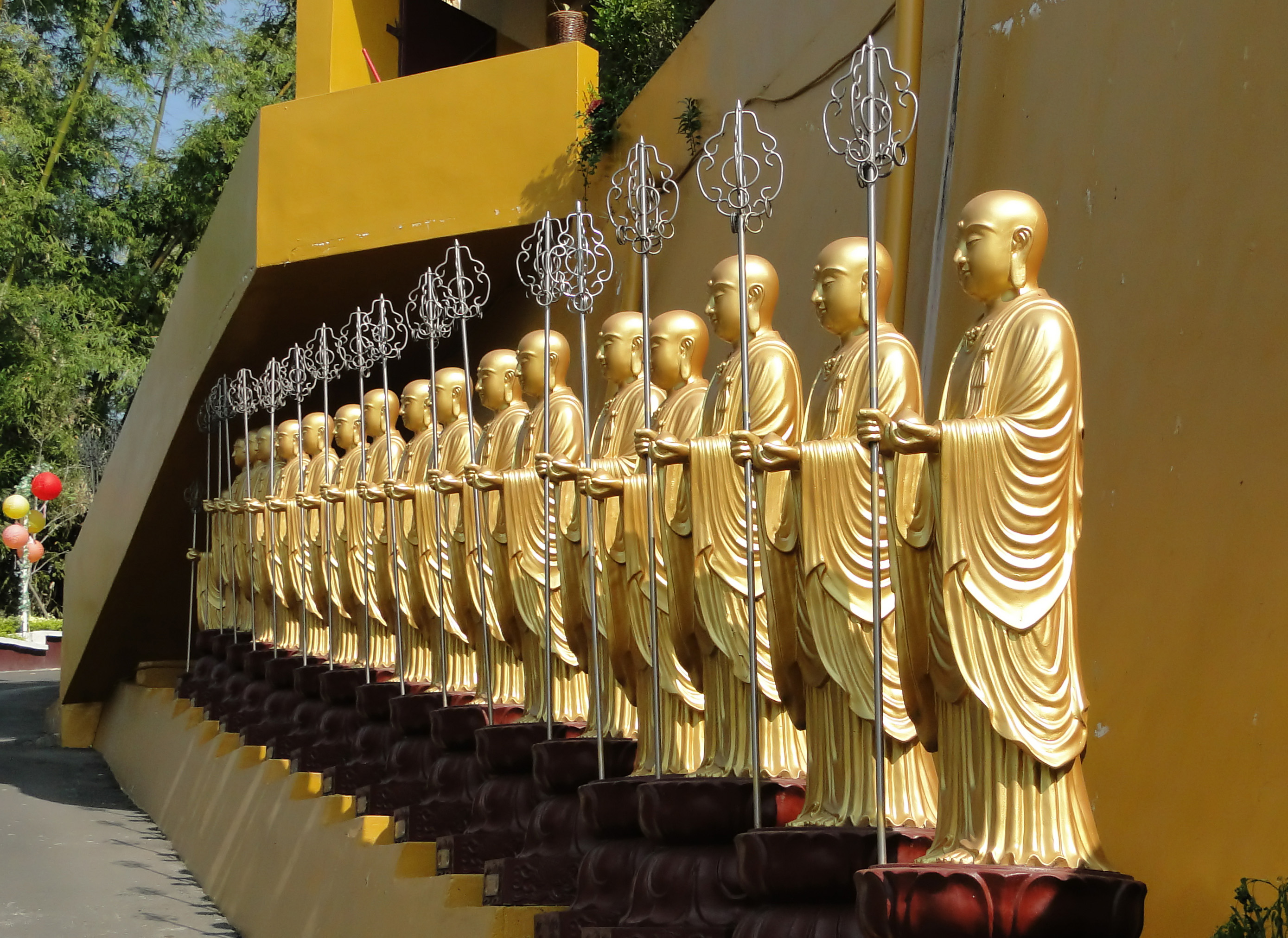
Buddha statues

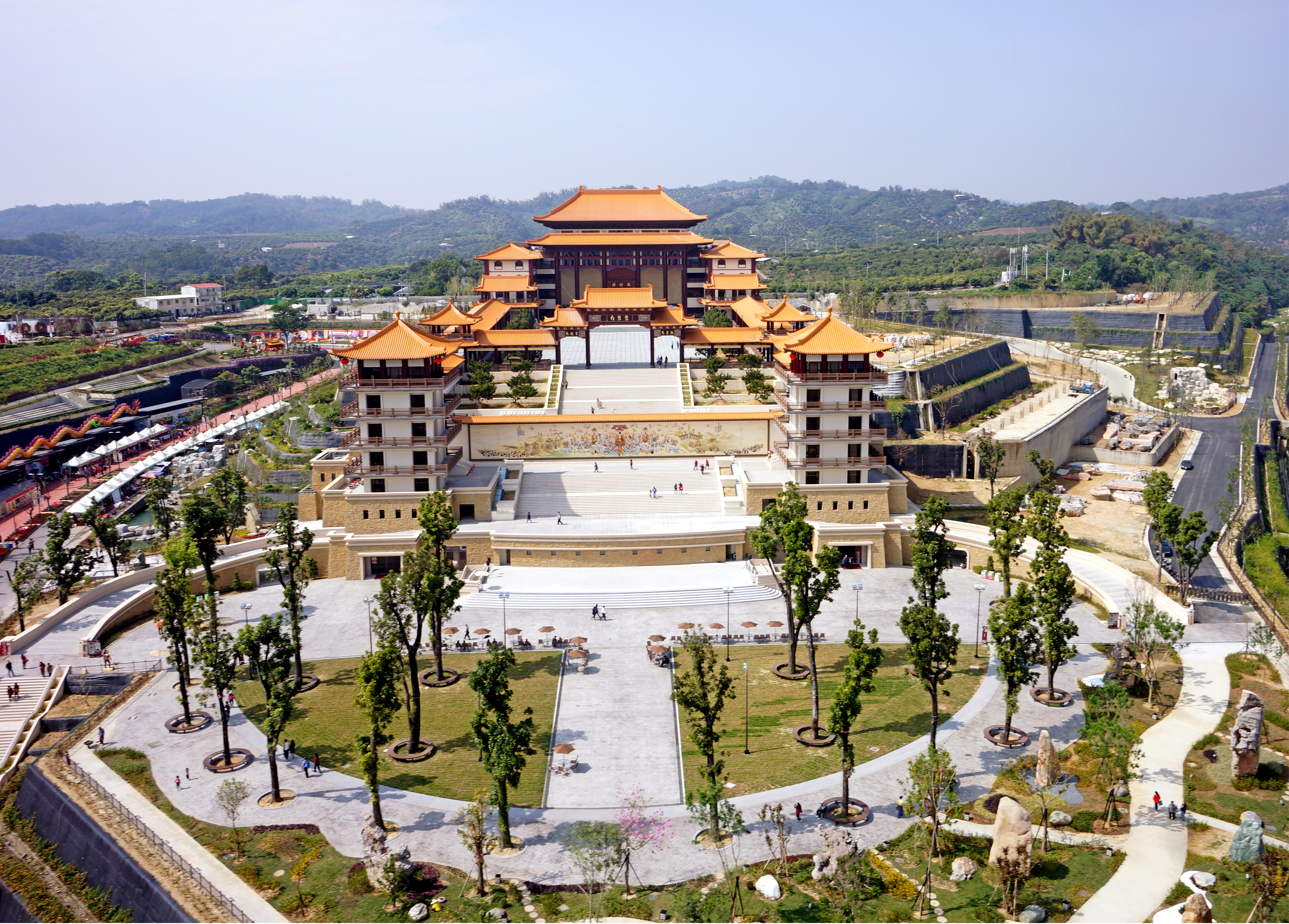
Patriarch Shrine and Sutra Repository

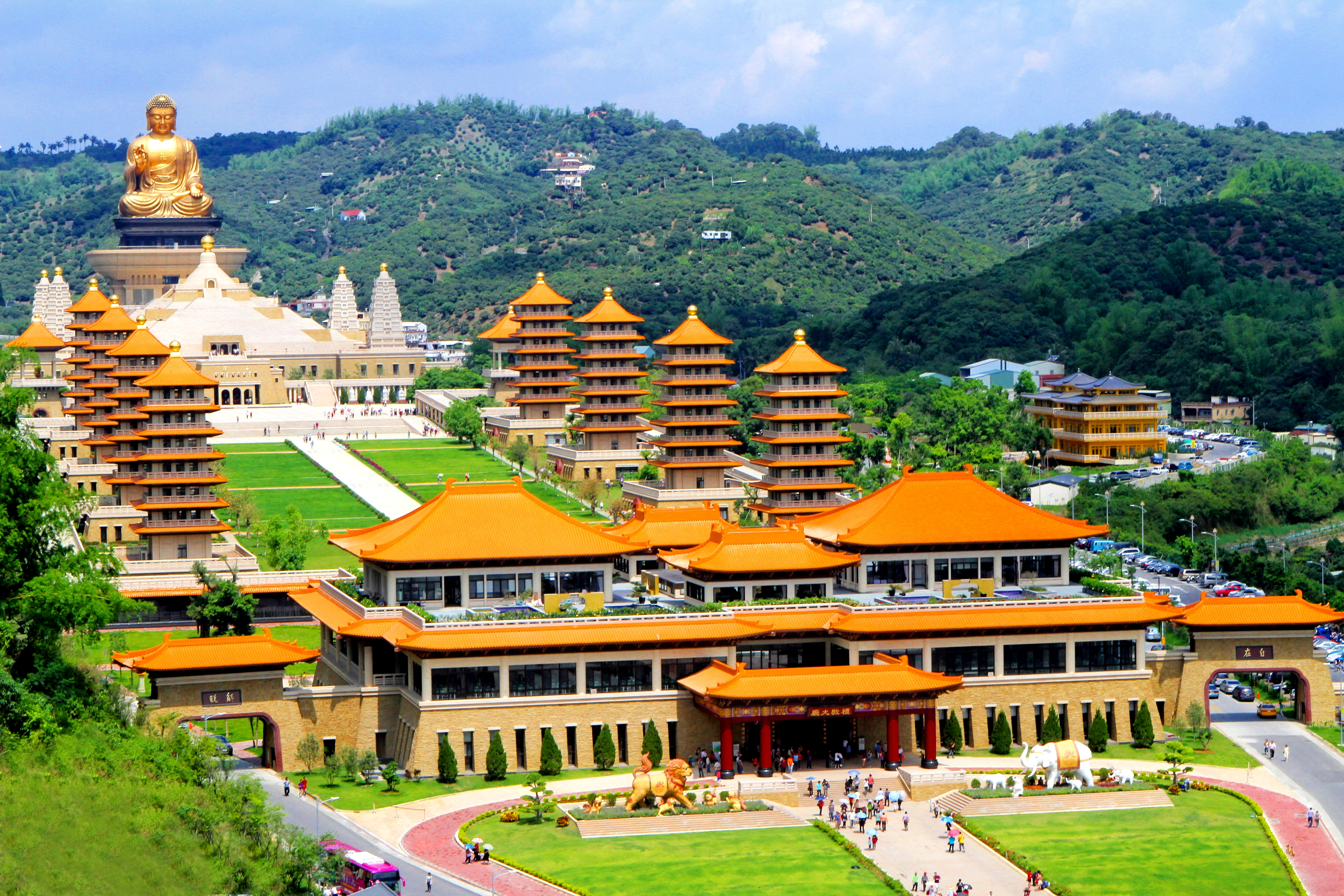
View of the FGS Buddha Museum

== Abbots ==
Unlike a traditional Mahayana Buddhist monastery, where the incumbent abbot usually selects his successor, Fo Guang Shan directly elects an abbot to head the Order and its temple branches worldwide. The abbot of Fo Guang Shan Monastery is the overall head of the order, and all Fo Guang Shan temples, and is the chairperson of the Religious Affairs Committee, serving a term of six years, with one reappointment by popular vote and, under exceptional circumstances, a second reappointment by two-thirds vote. The abbot is elected by all members of Fo Guang Shan through public vote. The abbot-elect then begins to use their "inner name", in place of his/her own dharma name, with the first character being Hsin ("心", xin, or heart). In fact, all monastics of Fo Guang Shan have such a name, and several Elders also use theirs publicly. At the beginning of the year, the abbot-elect is inaugurated as the new director of Fo Guang Shan through a dharma transmission ceremony, receiving the robe and bowl.

Hsing Yun is the only abbot to have served as such for more than two terms, and was not elected by the RAC. In the case of Venerable Hsin Ping (who was originally Venerable Zhizong), he was also not officially elected, as he was Hsing Yun's designated heir apparent. After Hsin Ping died, the vice director of Fo Guang Shan, Hsin Ting (originally Venerable Zhidu), was immediately elevated to serve the remaining years of Hsin Ping's term. Abbots have been elected according to FGS's constitution since then.

As with Hsing Yun, former abbots do not leave the order when they retire. They continue to make Dharma talks throughout the world and become head teachers of the order in their later years.

Hsing Yun
(1967–1985)

Hsin Ping
(1985–1995)

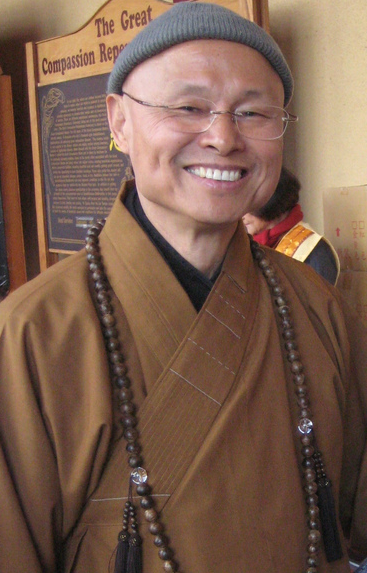
Hsin Ting
(1997–2005)

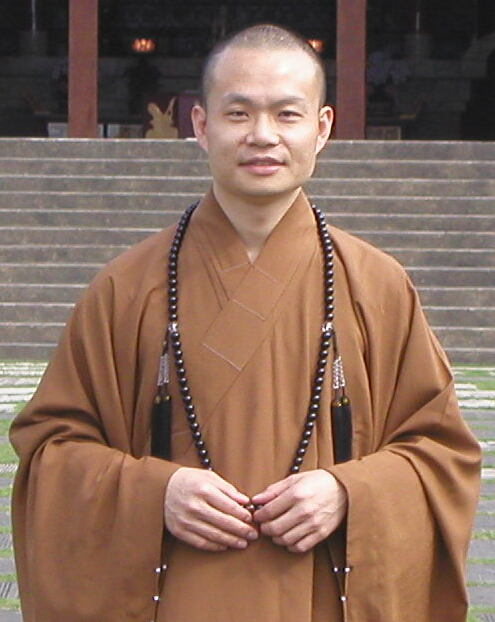
Hsin Pei
(2005–2013)

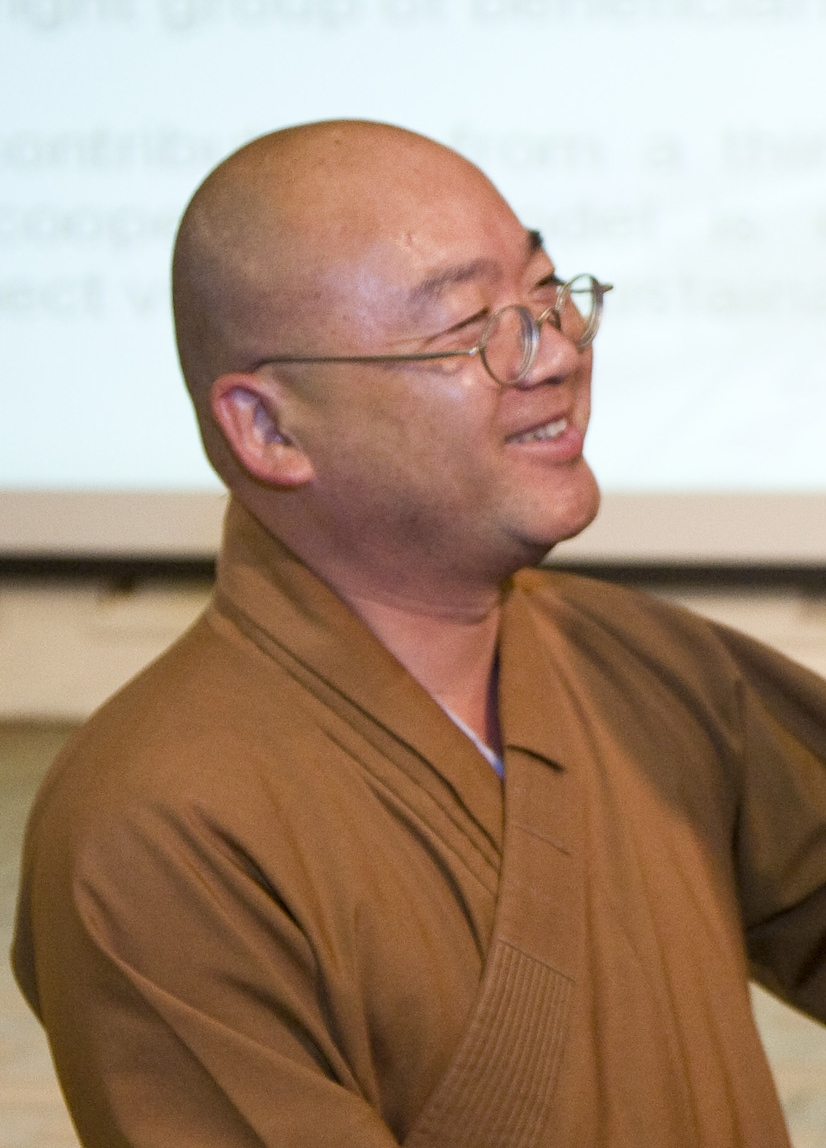
Hsin Bau
(2013–present)
