= Protection for Living Beings =

Feng Zikai collection

Protection for Living Beings is a book created by the painter Feng Zikai to commemorate the birthday of Master Hong Yi. He agreed to increase the number of pieces every ten years and decided to create the book. Feng insisted on his original intention and spent a total of 46 years on the paintings in the book.

In 1928, Feng committed to creating Protection for Living Beings in commemoration of his master, Master Hong Yi's birthday. The first edition of the painting was then released 10 years after on Hong's fiftieth birthday. This edition contained fifty of Master Hong's stories and poems. Ten years later, Feng released the second collection of Protection for Living Beings with sixty more works by Master Hong and the art illustrations by Feng for Hong's sixtieth birthday. Although Hong died before he reached the age of seventy, Feng continued to publish one collection every ten years until the one hundredth anniversary of Hong's birth, with a total of one hundred stories and one hundred pictures. He persevered to do the illustration even when the Cultural Revolution broke out in China. A total of six collections of Protection for Living Beings were published, but Feng died before the sixth collection was published.

== Collections and chapters ==
There are a total of six collections and 450 chapters that depict "the preservation of life with the child-like heart-mind"

- The first volume contains 50 paintings and 50 poems (for the 50th birthday of Hong).
- The second volume contains 60 paintings and 60 poems (for the 60th birthday of Hong).
- The third volume contains 70 paintings and 70 poems (in commemoration of the 70th birthday of Hong).
- The fourth volume contains 80 paintings and 80 poems (in commemoration of the 80th birthday of Hong).
- The fifth volume contains 90 paintings and 90 poems (in commemoration of the 90th birthday of Hong).
- The sixth volume contains 100 paintings and 100 poems (in commemoration of the 100th birthday of Hong). (Feng died before the book was published.)

== History ==
In 1930, due to the Central Plains War, Shandong became a war zone, and Zhucheng was besieged. During the war, Mr. Li Bingnan, the founder of Taichung Buddhist Lotus Society (TCBL), read Feng's "Protection for Living Beings" and began to convert to the Pure Land Sect.

The Fo Guang Shan Buddha Museum in Kaohsiung, Taiwan, chose eighty-six color murals depicting the protection of life from Feng’s "Protection for Living Beings". Those murals are arrayed along the outer walls of the long walkway of the museum.
