= Fo Guang Shan Buddha Museum =

Museum in Dashu, Kaohsiung, Taiwan

- 佛光山佛陀紀念館
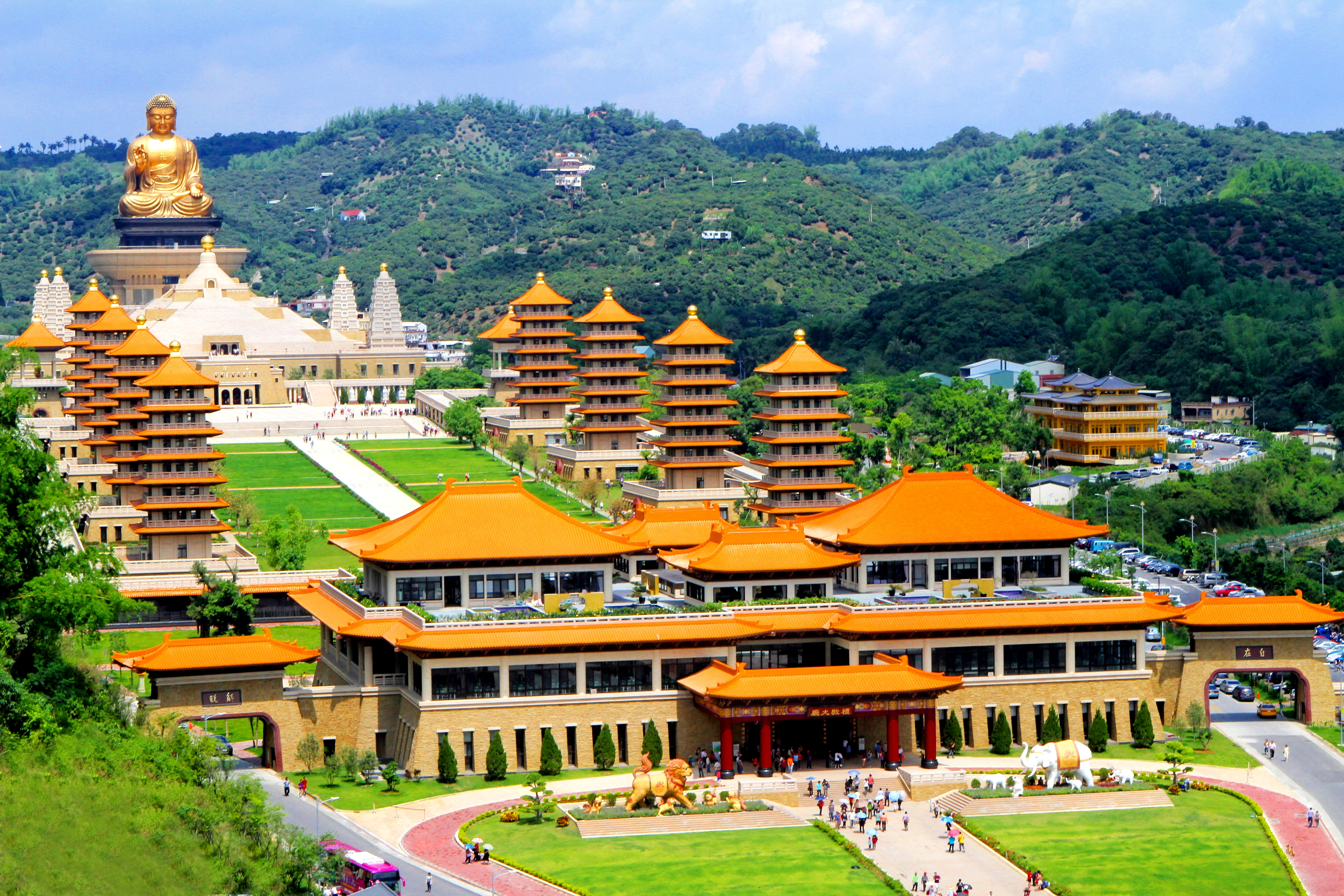

- Location within Taiwan
- Established: 25 December 2011
- Location: Dashu, Kaohsiung, Taiwan
- Coordinates: 22.75708°N 120.44135°E
- Type: Museum

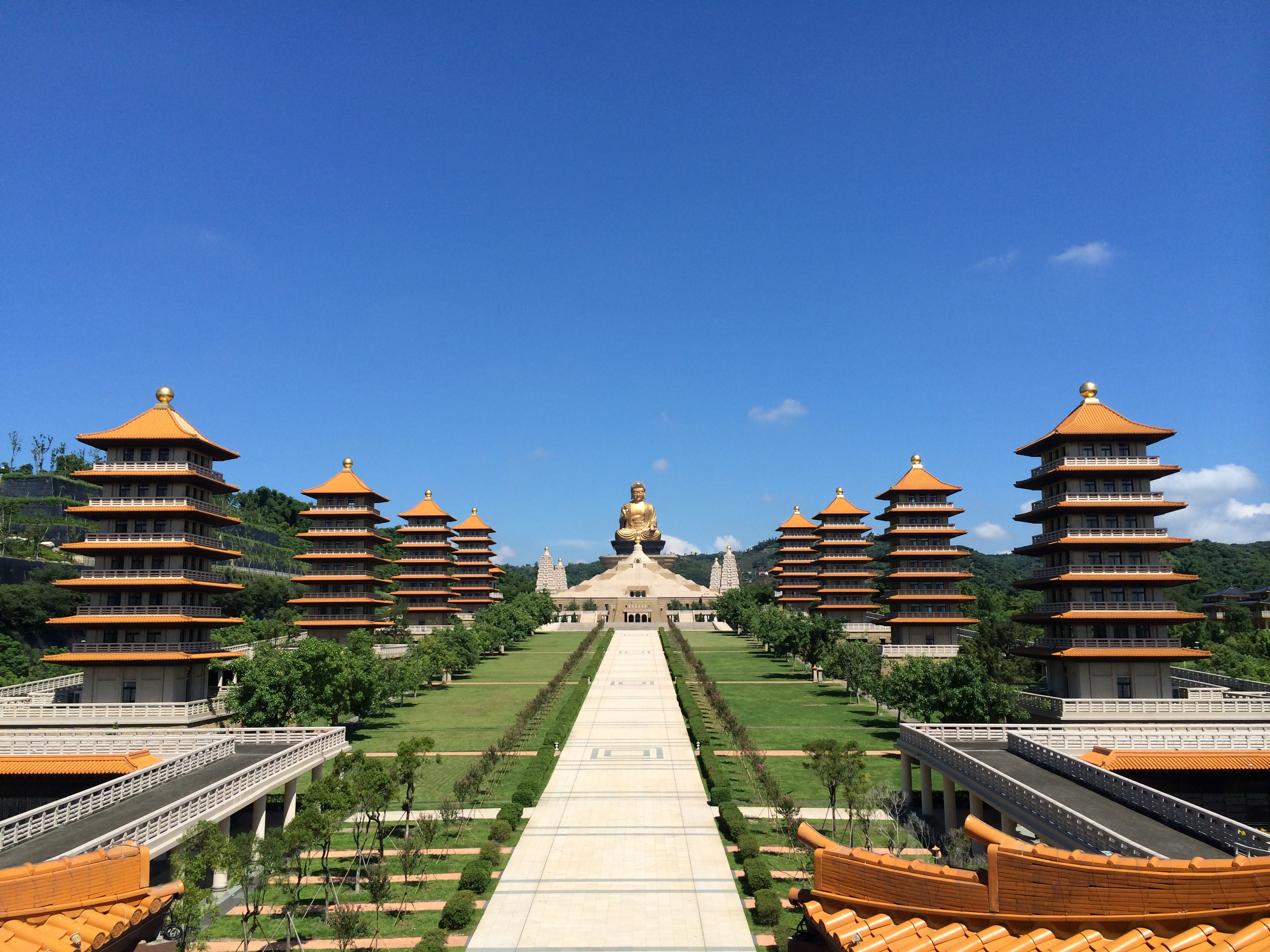
View of the Fo Guang Big Buddha and eight pagodas from the 2nd floor of the Front Hall

The Fo Guang Shan Buddha Museum (Chinese: 佛光山佛陀紀念館; pinyin: Fóguāngshān Fótuó jìniànguǎn), formerly known as the Buddha Memorial Center, is a Mahāyāna Buddhist cultural, religious, and educational museum located in Dashu District, Kaohsiung, Taiwan. The museum is affiliated with Fo Guang Shan, one of Taiwan's largest Buddhist organizations. The museum is located next to the Fo Guang Shan Monastery, the headquarters of the order. The museum houses one of the tooth relics of Shakyamuni Buddha, the founder of the Buddhist faith. The museum was accepted as the youngest member of the International Council of Museums (ICOM) in 2014.

Since 2015, the museum has been certified ISO 50001 2011 by the Quality management system.

== History ==
In 1998, Venerable Master Hsing Yun travelled to Bodh Gaya, India to confer the precepts for full ordination. He was entrusted with a tooth relic by Kunga Dorje Rinpoche who had safeguarded the relic for nearly 30 years. Rinpoche was touched by the efforts of Fo Guang Shan in promoting exchanges between different Buddhist traditions, and he hoped that the relic could be enshrined in Taiwan as a symbol of Dharma preservation. Speaking about the need to build the shrine, the Venerable Master said "The Buddha does not need anybody's worship or reverence; it is living beings that need inspiration to develop wholesome thoughts and purify their minds. By worshipping a memorial, people can come to know the Buddha's Dharma body, and their feelings of admiration can be elevated to wanting to learn about the Buddha's virtues and practice them in everyday life. The Buddha doesn’t need a memorial, but living beings do. I built this pagoda with this in mind."

The museum's construction started in 2008, and was officially opened to the public in December 2011. More than 100 alterations were made to the museum's actual design. Just before the foundation was finished, Venerable Master Hsing Yun was moved to put out a basic plan for the future Buddha Museum using a few mineral water bottles, a tissue box, and some newspapers.

=== Missions of the Buddha Museum ===
- 48 Underground Palaces - to preserve human civilization and record human history
- Buddhist Art - to promote Buddhist arts through exhibitions and academic conferences
- Inter-Museum Exchanges - to gain mutual support and encourage new ideas through inter-museum interactions
- Life Education - to promote cultural arts and environmental protection
- Public Services

=== Objectives of the Buddha Museum ===
- To present Buddhism through arts and culture
- To present Buddhism through motion pictures and movies
- To present Buddhism through humanistic dimensions
- To present Buddhism through international dynamics

=== Core Values ===
==== Three Acts of Goodness ====
- Do Good Deeds
- Speak Good Words
- Think Good Thoughts

==== Four Givings ====
- Giving Other Confidence
- Giving Others Joy
- Giving Others Hope
- Giving Others Convenience

== Architecture ==
=== Front Hall ===
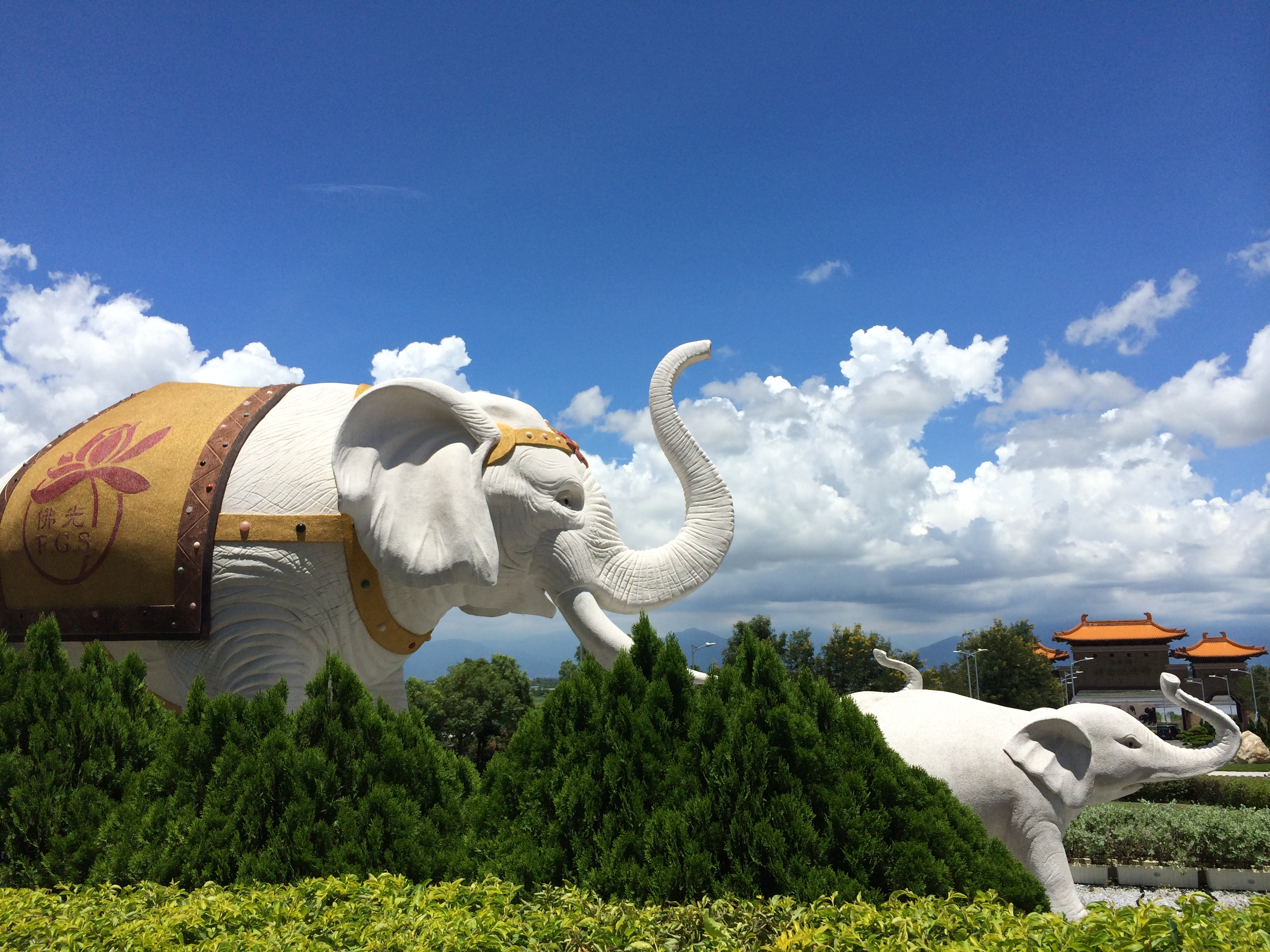
View of the White Elephant from the Front Hall

The Front Hall is flanked by the Gate of Perfect Ease and the Gate of Liberation. The lion and elephant, both accompanied by smaller cubs, welcome guests from either side of the doors. The elephant on the right, measuring five-meters tall and six meters long, symbolizes the conception of Prince Siddhartha who entered the womb of his mother on a white elephant. The lion on the left has the same measurements and represents the roar of the Buddha's teachings. Inside, visitors may borrow wheelchairs and baby-strollers from the Information Desk. There are also restaurants and a buffet.

Included inside is a semi-permanent shop dedicated to Wu Ching, a sculptor who became famous for his work with gold and who was one of the first exhibits at the museum. Liuli Gongfang also has a shop/gallery opposite one of the restaurants featuring work by the artist Loretta Yang, whose Thousand-Armed, Thousand-Eyes Avalokiteśvara statue is a permanent fixture in the Avalokiteśvara Shrine.

=== Eight Pagodas ===
There are eight pagodas, each representing different ideas or precepts.

==== One Teaching Pagoda ====
One teaching refers to Humanistic Buddhism, which represents Buddhist teachings that advocate ways to a happier life. The One Teaching Pagoda serves as a multi-functional space for holding meetings, activities, and training courses. It is available to the public for rent.

==== Two Assemblies Pagoda ====
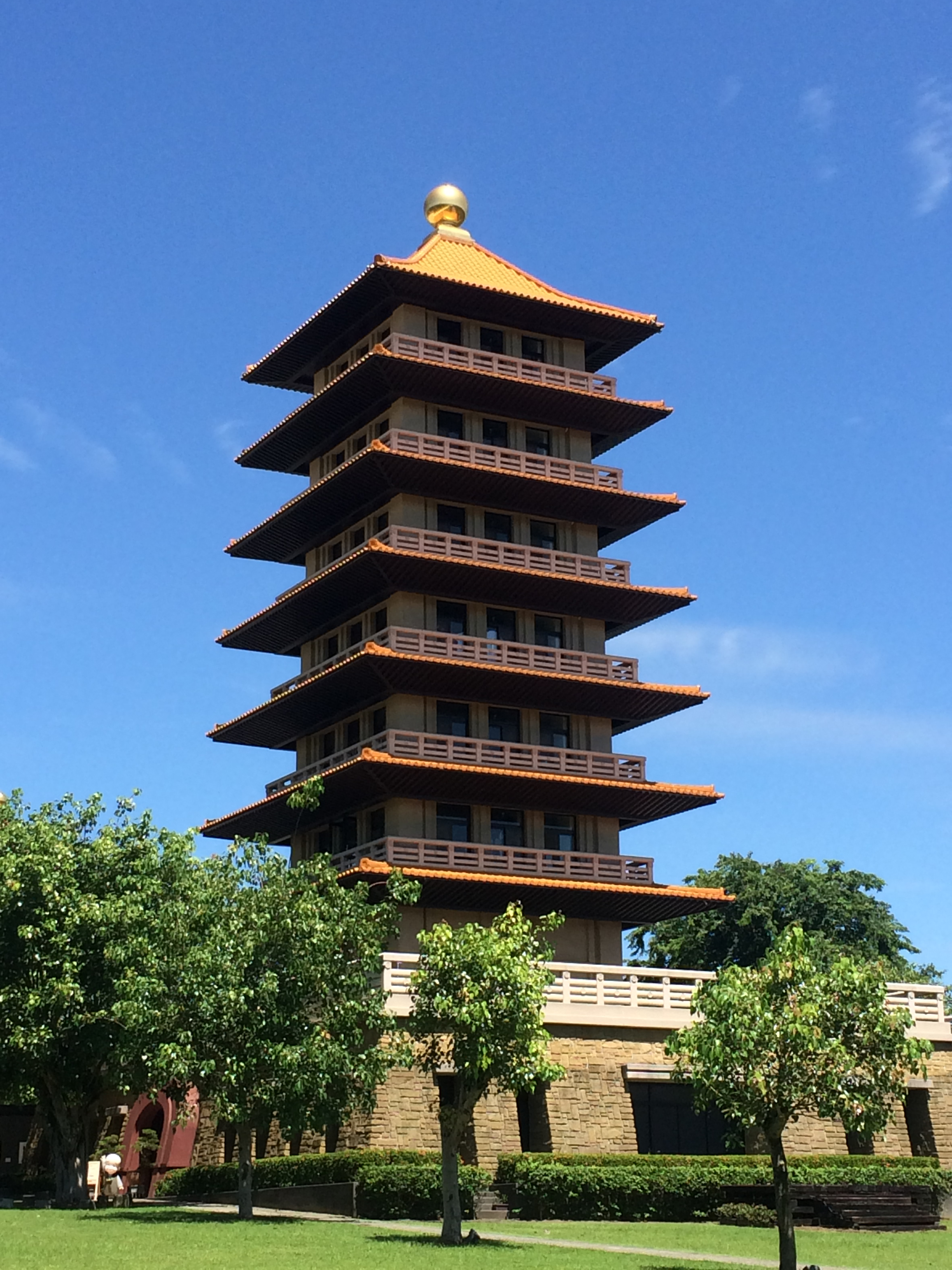
Two Assemblies Pagoda

The two assemblies refer to both the monastic and lay assemblies. The pagoda was designed with children in mind. Through interactive 3D videos, children learn to practice the Three Acts of Goodness. The multimedia theater is designed with sensory screens to allow interaction with the audience. Visitors can also experience releasing sky lanterns in a virtual way.

The pagoda serves as a Children's Gallery and is designed with interactive games which children can interact with. A 3D theatre allows them to learn how to practice doing good deeds, saying good words, and having good thoughts.

==== Three Goodness Pagoda ====
The Three Goodness refers to the wholesome deeds of the body, speech, and mind. The pagoda is a joint office consisting of a meeting room and two guest halls.

==== Four Givings Pagoda ====
The four givings refer to Giving Others Confidence, Giving Others Joy, Giving Others Hope, and Giving Others Convenience. This Pagoda serves as a bookstore where visitors can read and relax. Every Saturday and Sunday, there are story-telling sessions from 10 am to 4:30 pm at the children corner. Multimedia including chanting, children singing, and orchestral music, are also available at the bookstore.

==== Five Harmonies Pagoda ====
The five harmonies refer to "personal harmony achieved through joy, interpersonal harmony achieved through respect, family harmony achieved through deference, social harmony achieved through cooperation, and world harmony achieved through peace." The pagoda serves to celebrate family events in different ways, including Buddhist weddings, baby blessing ceremonies, and birthday celebrations. Families can also take photographs to keep as albums for remembering those joyous occasions.

==== Six Perfections Pagoda ====
The pagoda is named after the Six Perfections, namely giving, ethics, patience, diligence, meditation, and wisdom. The pagoda is fitted with a long-term exhibition displaying information on Venerable Master Hsing Yun Public Education Trust Fund and the works of Venerable Master's One-Stroke Calligraphy. Through a 3D video presentation, viewers get to watch how Venerable Master penned his calligraphy works in one stroke using his inner eye.

==== Seven Admonishment Pagoda ====
The seven admonishments refer to admonishing drugs, pornography, violence, stealing, gambling, alcohol, and harsh words. Through these seven admonishments, all individuals, families, and even the society would be influenced by a positive mindset. When everyone thinks positively, the society would become a blissful pure land. The Seven Admonishment Pagoda serves as a resting place where visitors can have a cup of tea and relax.

==== Eightfold Path Pagoda ====
The Eightfold Path includes the eight elements that leads a person to liberation: right view, right understanding, right speech, right action, right livelihood, right effort, right mindfulness, and right concentration. The Eightfold Path Pagoda serves a resting place where visitors can watch introductory videos.

=== Twin Pavilions ===
A gold-colored structure surrounded by a pond filled with lotuses. The 1st floor is the Tea House that serves Taiwanese cuisine in vegetarian form. Visitors can sample Tea Chan and Sutra Calligraphy on the 2nd and 3rd floors, respectively. Keynote lectures are also conducted on the 3rd floor. These lectures are open to public and discuss issues on education, culture and the arts.

=== Bodhi Wisdom Concourse ===
==== Eighteen Arhats ====
These statues are lined along the sides of the court and were designed by the Taiwanese sculptor Wu Jung-Tzu. They feature the Ten Great Disciples of the Buddha, which include Śāriputra, Maudgalyāyana, Mahākāśyapa, Subhūti, Pūrṇa, Kātyāyana, Aniruddha, Upāli, Rāhula, and Ānanda), along with three arhats from the Amitabha Sutra (Cudapanthaka, Pindola, Kalodayin), and two arhats from Chinese folklore (the Dragon-Subduing Arhat and the Tiger-Taming Arhat). In a move to show equality between the sexes, the Venerable Master Hsing Yun also included 3 female bhiksunis: Mahaprajapati, Bhadra Kapilani, Utpalavarna.

==== Eight Patriarchs ====
These are located along the front of the Main Hall. They depict the founding patriarchs of the Eight Mahayana Schools of Chinese Buddhism and were designed by the Taiwanese sculptor Wu Jung-Tzu. The eight patriarchs are:

- Jizang of the Three Treatise school
- Xianshou of the Huayan school
- Xuanzang of the Faxiang school
- Zhiyi of the Tiantai school
- Bodhidharma of the Chan school
- Huiyuan of the Pure Land school
- Daoxuan of the Nanshan Vinaya school
- Subhakarasimha of the Vajrayana school

=== Main Hall ===
The Main Hall is a domed-shaped stupa built in the Indian style. The base is made from yellow sandstone while the body is made from rock. The spire in the center is a sutra repository that houses a million copies of the Heart Sutra. The "One Million Heart Sutras in the Buddha" movement was launched with the construction of the Buddha Museum.

==== Mount Potalaka Avalokiteśvara Shrine ====
Located at the front of the Main Hall. The shrine houses the Thousand-Armed, Thousand-Eyes Avalokiteśvara statue made by the contemporary glass artist Loretta Yang. The statue measures almost 5 meters tall, and is currently the tallest statue by the artist. Avalokitesvara is flanked by Sudhana and the Naga girl. The semicircular wall behind Avalokitesvara depicts the Great Compassion Mantra while the sides are lined with the 33 manifestations of Avalokitesvara Bodhisattva. The exterior wall of the shrine is decorated with the Universal Gate Chapter of the Lotus Sutra.

==== Golden Buddha Shrine ====
This is located directly behind the Avalokiteśvara Shrine and houses a golden statue of the Buddha that was gifted to Fo Guang Shan in 2004 by the Supreme Patriarch of Thailand, Somdet Phra Nyanasamvara, for his 90th birthday.

==== Jade Buddha Shrine ====
The shrine is located at the very back of the Main Hall. It houses a Reclining Buddha statue sculpted from Burmese white jade. The statue symbolizes the Buddha's passing into parinirvana. Enshrined in a reliquary above the statue is the Buddha's tooth relic. The adjacent walls flanking the statue are colorful jade reliefs of the Western Sukhavati Pure Land of Amitabha Buddha and the Eastern Vaidurya Pure Land of the Medicine Buddha. The side walls are of sandalwood reliefs of stupas and pagodas sculpted in a variety of forms and shapes.

==== Museum of Underground Palaces ====
This gallery exhibits artifacts from various Underground Palaces but predominantly from the one discovered beneath Famen Temple.

==== Museum of Buddhist Festivals ====
The gallery explains various Buddhist festivals that are celebrated at Fo Guang Shan with interactive technology. These festivals include:

- Bathing the Baby Buddha on Buddha's Birthday
- Taking 3 Steps 1 Bow Ceremony on Avalokitesvara's Birthday
- Observing Ullambana during the seventh lunar month
- Offering food to the Sangha on Sangha Day

==== Historical Museum of Fo Guang Shan ====
This gallery shows in great detail the complete history of Fo Guang Shan up to 2011.

==== Museum of the Life of the Buddha ====
Tells the story of Sakyamuni Buddha from his birth to his parinirvana. The gallery also plays two 4D short films during the day for free.

- Morning show: Life of the Buddha
- Afternoon show: The Poor Girl's Lamp

==== Great Enlightenment Auditorium ====
This facility is located on the 3rd floor. The multi-functional auditorium can accommodate 2,000 people. In the center, there is a 360-degree screen. The round stage in the center of the floor can be rotated so audiences can view the performances from different directions. Since its opening, many international troupes have performed at this auditorium.

=== Four Noble Truths Stupas ===
The Four Noble Truths Stupas, erected at the four corners of the Main Hall, are testaments to the first teaching that the Buddha gave following his enlightenment. The Four Noble Truths Stupas correspond to the Four Great Bodhisattvas: Avalokitesvara, Ksitigarbha, Manjusri, and Samantabhadra. Offerings of incense, flowers, and light can be made to the Bodhisattvas at these stupas.

=== Fo Guang Big Buddha ===
In 2011, the Fo Guang Big Buddha was completed after more than a year of casting, utilizing almost 1,800 ton of metal. The statue itself measures 40 meters high, the seat is 10 meters high. Altogether, the total height is 108 meters (an auspicious number in Buddhism). The statue depicts Sakyamuni Buddha.

== Underground Palaces ==
Though not open to the public, the Buddha Museum has 48 underground palaces that serve as time capsules. Its contents are artifacts that are either historic, contemporary, or commemorative in nature. The museum plans to open one of these underground palaces every hundred years and to place other items inside before sealing it again. A permanent exhibition about the underground palaces can be found on the first floor of the Main Hall.

== Art ==
=== Reliefs ===
These can be found along the covered walkways and within the Main Hall.

- There are 22 semi-reliefs of the Buddha's acts of compassion and wisdom collectively known as the Stories of the Buddha.
- The Chan Art and Stories are sampled from Chan Heart, Chan Art by Gao Er-tai and his wife Pu Xiaoyu.
- The Life Protection Murals were sculpted based on the Protecting Lives Series painted by Feng Zikai and his daughter, Feng Yiyin.
- Reliefs in jade illustrating the Western Pure Land of Amitabha Buddha and the Eastern Pure Land of the Medicine Buddha can be found in the Jade Buddha Shrine.
- Wooden reliefs depicting different styles of stupas from around the world can be found on the side walls of the Jade Buddha Shrine.

=== One-Stroke Calligraphy ===
Venerable Master Hsing Yun's One-Stroke Calligraphy can be seen throughout the museum on the walls and signs of each building. A more permanent exhibition is located in the Six Perfections Pagoda.

=== Statues ===
These are located toward the back of the museum.

- The Eighteen Arhats and Eight Patriarchs were designed by Wu Jung-Tzu and can be found at the Bodhi Wisdom Concourse.
- The Thousand-Armed, Thousand-Eyes Avalokiteśvara statue within the Avalokitesvara Shrine is made by the contemporary glass artist Loretta Yang
- The Golden Buddha statue inside the Golden Buddha Shrine was gifted to Fo Guang Shan from the 19th Supreme Patriarch of Thailand in 2004. For his 90th birthday, Somdet Phra Nyanasamvara had 19 statues made and gifted them to countries where Buddhism flourished. Fo Guang Shan was hand-picked to represent Taiwan.
- The Reclining Buddha statue inside the Jade Buddha Shrine was sculpted from white jade from Burma.
- The Fo Guang Big Buddha located at the very back is made from 1,800 tons of metal and measures 40 meters tall.

=== Sculpture ===
A camphor wooden carving depicting Sakyamuni Buddha teaching the Dharma at Vulture Peak to Five Hundred Arhats is visible in the lobby of the Main Hall.

=== Art Galleries ===
These are located on the 1st floor and 2nd floor of the Main Hall. There are 4 permanent exhibitions on the 1st floor. The galleries on the 2nd floor are non-permanent and are frequently changed to exhibit art from around the world.

== Education ==
Under Fo Guang Shan's objective to "foster talent through education" the museum has an educational curriculum which hosts educational courses that follow the Three Acts of Goodness - doing good deeds, speaking good words, thinking good thoughts.

== Awards ==
- 2012 - Winner of the Golden Lion Award for Culture and Education in the 13th National Architecture Golden Award.
- 2013 - Listed in “Top Hundred Religious Spots in Taiwan” by the Ministry of the Interior.
- 2014 - Certified as the youngest member of International Council of Museums (ICOM).
- 2014 - Winner of TripAdvisor 2014's Traveler's Choice Award and ranked top as the most popular tourist spot in Kaohsiung
- 2014 Oct 25 - Received the Excellent Lavatory Award by the Kaohsiung government.
- 2014 Nov 13 - Became the first religious organization and museum to receive the ISO 50001 energy management certification.
- 2014 Dec 16 - Bus Lavatory listed as an Excellent Lavatory by the Environmental Protection Administration, and in the digital book The Magic Journey of the Toilet Kingdom.
- 2015 Oct 31 - Runner-Up for "Public Restroom" Award in Tourist Scenic Site Category of Kaohsiung
- 2016 Jan 16 - Fifth China Tourism Investment ITIA "Best Historical and Cultural Theme Tourism Project Award"
- 2016 May - Winner of TripAdvisor 2016 Travelers' Choice Award and ranked fourth in the Top Ten Landmarks of Taiwan
- 2017 - Certified as a member of American Alliance of Museums (AAM)
- 2017 - Received 2017 Certificate of Excellence from TripAdvisor
- 2018 - Received 2018 Certificate of Excellence from TripAdvisor
- 2019 - Received 2018 Certificate of Excellence from TripAdvisor
- 2020 - Received 2020 Travelers' Choice Award from TripAdvisor
- 2024 - Received 2024 Travelers' Choice Award from TripAdvisor

== See also ==
- IBPS Manila
- Zu Lai Temple
- Chung Tian Temple
- Hsi Lai Temple
- Nan Hua Temple
