= Fo Guang Shan Temple, Toronto =

Fo Guang Shan Temple
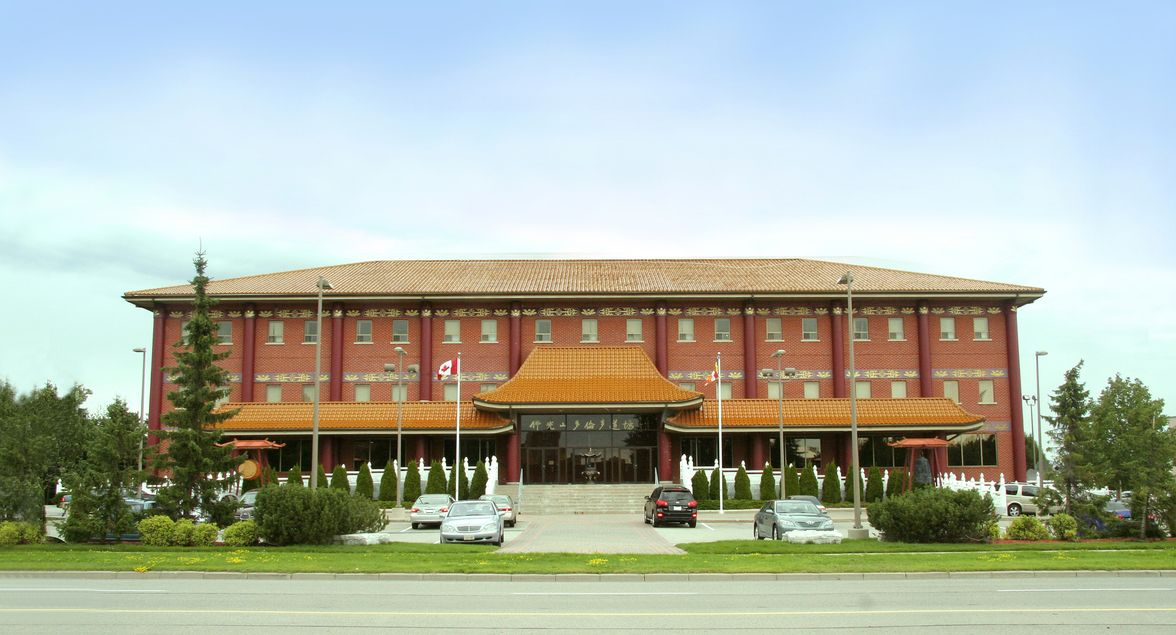

Religion
- Affiliation: Mahayana

Location
- Location: 6525 Millcreek Drive, Mississauga, Ontario; L5N 7K6
- Interactive map of Fo Guang Shan Temple
- Coordinates: 43.5914°N 79.7430°W

Architecture
- Type: Temple

Website
- fgs.ca/

Fo Guang Shan Temple of Toronto (Chinese: 多倫多佛光山; pinyin: duō lún duō fó guāng shān) was built to serve as a cultural, educational, community and spiritual centre for Chinese Buddhism and those interested in Buddhist teachings and practice. Founded by Venerable Master Hsing Yun in 1991 and completed in 1997, Fo Guang Shan Temple of Toronto (FGS Toronto) is one of the over 400 Fo Guang Shan Temples worldwide. It was founded with the intention to propagate Humanistic Buddhism to the local community in the Greater Toronto Area, which emphasizes bringing Buddhist teaching into our daily lives and maintaining harmony with the environment, society, each other and within ourselves.

The Toronto Buddhist temple branch is located in Mississauga, Ontario, and also operates satellite Dharma centres (Buddha's Light Center) in Markham and Kitchener-Waterloo. The Mississauga facility is approximately 50,000 square feet, and provides many modern functions and services while presenting traditional Chinese temple architecture and style. The building includes a magnificent main shrine, tea house (Water Drop Teahouse), traditional Chan meditation hall, Buddhist cultural museum, library, and bookstore. The Buddha's Light Centres were built to offer members in the eastern portions of the Greater Toronto Area who may not be able to travel to the Mississauga branch.

== Objectives ==
Fo Guang Shan, which means “Buddha’s Light Mountain” was founded by Venerable Master Hsing Yun in 1967 in Taiwan according to the principles of Humanistic Buddhism. Humanistic Buddhism emphasizes the role of Buddhist teachings and practice in daily life, and encompasses several major Chinese Buddhist schools, including Chan, Pure Land and Mind Only. Fo Guang Shan promotes Humanistic Buddhism through the pursuit of four objectives:

- To propagate Buddhist teachings through cultural activities
- To nurture talents through education
- To benefit societies through charitable programs
- To purify human hearts and minds through Buddhist practices

== Activities ==
Accordingly, Fo Guang Shan Temple of Toronto has strived to deliver on these objectives to the GTA community. The temple is open to the public and all are welcome to participate in any of the many activities offered.

- Culture: The temple holds cultural events to help bring the East and West together in peace and understanding. These include participation in many local events, as well as annual celebrations of Chinese New Year, Vesak (Buddha's Birthday), and a vegetarian food fair. The temple also offers a traditional Chinese tea house, public tours, and a cultural museum with Buddhist art, sculpture, and calligraphy.
- Education: The temple offers regular courses in English, Mandarin and Cantonese on Buddhism and meditation. It also offers a wide variety of special interest classes in music, cooking, art, crafts, exercise and more. It also provides extensive youth and children's programs. There is also a large library with both English and Chinese resources.
- Charity: The temple raises funds and provides volunteers for many worthwhile causes in the local community, as well as supporting worldwide initiatives coordinated by the global Fo Guang Shan organization. Thousands of donors and volunteers give generously of their time and money every year to provide assistance where it is most needed.
- Practice: The temple is a spiritual centre, providing devotees with a facility for meditation and holding weekly Buddhist chanting services, regular ceremonies, meditation retreats and other special events. The temple maintains a number of resident monastics who provide constant teaching, guidance and coordination to lay members.

== History ==
All Fo Guang Shan temples, including Toronto, are operated by both monastic and lay members working together. Fo Guang Shan monastics are members of the International Buddhist Progress Society (IBPS), while laypeople are members of the Buddha's Light International Association (BLIA). In July 1991, FGS Founder Venerable Master Hsing Yun visited Toronto to inaugurate the Toronto Chapter of the BLIA. During his visit, the Toronto devotees also requested a continuing monastic presence through the creation of an International Buddhist Progress Society (IBPS) centre where Dharma classes, chanting sessions and family-oriented activities could be organized. Master Hsing Yun agreed and assigned a monastic to be the Abbess of the new centre. The new dharma centre was originally located in North York. It quickly became an important resource in Eastern Toronto and beyond, holding Dharma classes in Mandarin, Cantonese, and English. Seeing this rapid expansion, Venerable Master Hsing Yun decided to purchase a piece of land in Mississauga in 1992 to build the FGS Temple of Toronto, a 50,000 square foot facility to meet the needs of the local Chinese population and propagate the Dharma to the local community.

The inexhaustible efforts of volunteers, donors, devotees, and monastics continued for the next several years. Construction was completed at the end of 1996 and the temple officially opened on August 10, 1997. The finished building included the main shrine, a traditional meditation hall, a cultural museum, a modern conference room, a bookstore, a library, and a tea house. The facility fulfils many modern and practical functions while presenting the traditional facade of a Chinese Buddhist temple.
