= Hsin Pei =

Taiwanese Buddhist monk

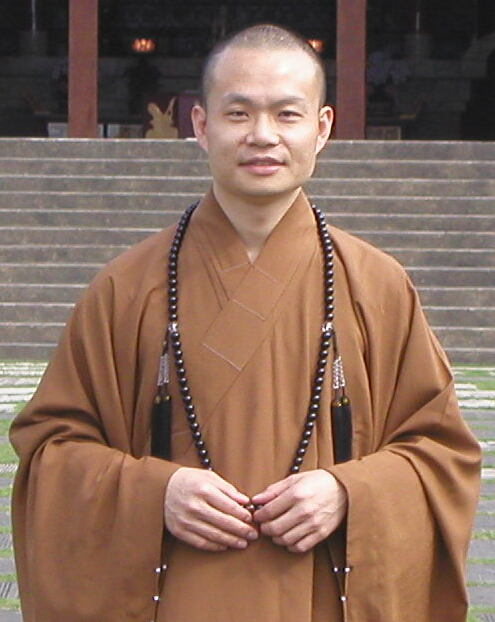
- Title: Most Venerable

Personal life
- Born: March 13, 1970 (age 56) Penghu County, Taiwan

Religious life
- Religion: Buddhism
- School: Fo Guang Shan
- Dharma names: Hui Han (慧翰); Zhide (智德)

Senior posting
- Teacher: Hsing Yun
- Predecessor: Hsin Ting
- Successor: Hsin Bau

Hsin Pei (Chinese: 心培和尚; pinyin: Xīnpéi Héshàng; Pe̍h-ōe-jī: sim-pôe hô siōng; born March 13, 1970) is a Taiwanese Buddhist monk and elder of the Fo Guang Shan order. He served two terms as abbot and director of the order from 2007 to 2013. The youngest abbot ever elected to the order, Hsin Pei was elected by the members of Fo Guang Shan worldwide in 2004 and succeeded retiring abbot Hsin Ting in 2005. His term ended in March 2013 and was succeeded by Hsin Bau, the former abbot of Hsi Lai Temple.

Buddhist titles
Preceded by Hsin Ting	Abbot and Director of Fo Guang Shan; 16 January 2005 – 12 March 2013	Succeeded by Hsin Bau
