= Hsin Bau =

Taiwanese Buddhist monk (born 1964)

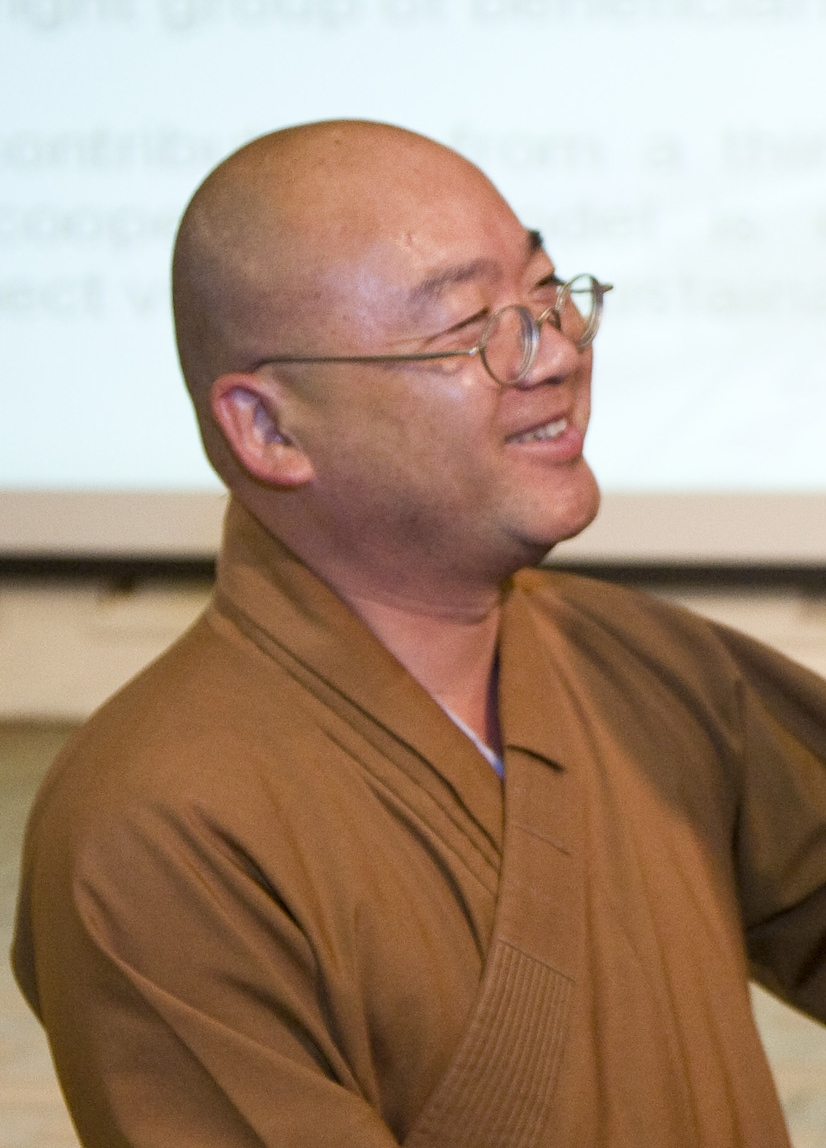
- Hsin Bau as abbot of Hsi Lai Temple, 2010
- Title: Most Venerable

Personal life
- Born: Chi Rung Wang; September 17, 1964 Taichung, Taiwan

Religious life
- Religion: Buddhism
- School: Linji school; Fo Guang Shan Lineage
- Lineage: 49th generation
- Dharma names: Hui Chi (慧濟); Zhifa (智法)

Senior posting
- Teacher: Hsing Yun
- Predecessor: Hsin Pei

Hsin Bau (Chinese: 心保和尚; pinyin: Xīnbǎo Héshàng; Pe̍h-ōe-jī: sim-pó hô siōng; born September 17, 1964) is a Taiwanese Buddhist monk and elder of the Fo Guang Shan worldwide Buddhist organization who currently serves as its head abbot and director since 2013, and guiding teacher of the order since 2023. Hsin Bau ordained as a śrāmaṇera novice under Hsing Yun in 1986. In 1988, he received the full upasampadā vinaya precepts at Hsi Lai Temple, the North American regional headquarters of Fo Guang Shan, in California, during which time he received the dharma name Hui Chi (慧濟). In 2004, he was appointed abbot of Hsi Lai Temple, where he had been stationed for several years. In 2013, he was elected head abbot of Fo Guang Shan; Following tradition, he now uses his inner dharma name, Hsin Bau, as abbot and chairman of the board of directors. He was subsequently re-elected to a second term as abbot in 2018.

Buddhist titles
Preceded by Hsin Pei	Abbot and Director of Fo Guang Shan; 12 March 2013 – present	Succeeded by Incumbent
