= Fo Guang Shan =

Worldwide Buddhist community founded by Hsing Yun

- 佛光山
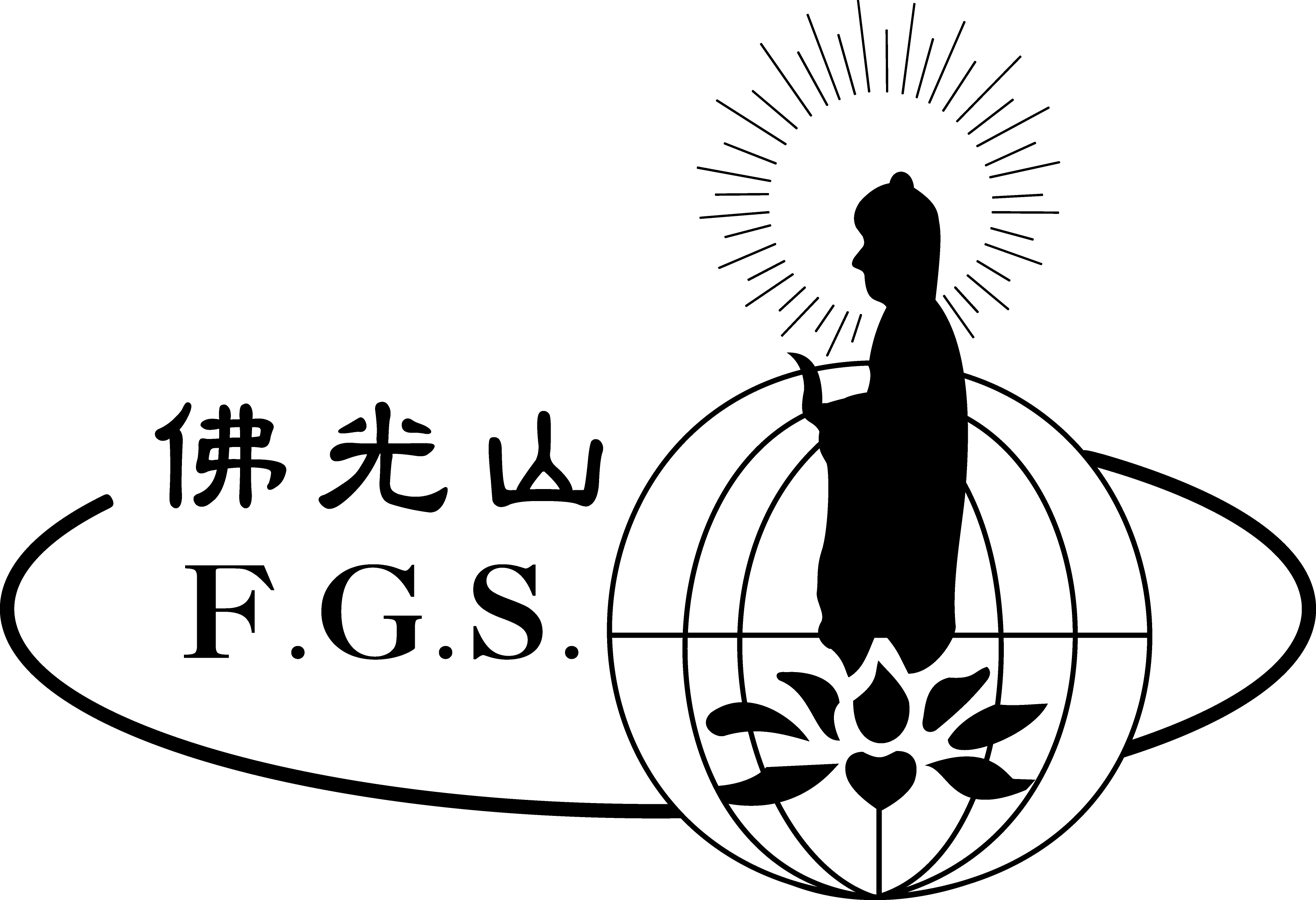
- The Fo Guang Shan logo: a standing Buddha over a globe
- Established: 1967
- Founder: Hsing Yun
- Type: Buddhist Monastic Order
- Purpose: Dissemination of Humanistic Buddhism in daily life
- Headquarters: Fo Guang Shan Monastery, Kaohsiung, Taiwan
- Region served: Worldwide
- Head Abbot: Most Ven. Hsin Bau
- Main organ: FGS Board of Directors; FGS Sangha Affairs Committee
- Website: www.fgs.org.tw/en

Fo Guang Shan
- Chinese: 佛光山
- Literal meaning: Buddha's Light Mountain
Transcriptions
Standard Mandarin
- Hanyu Pinyin: Fóguāngshān
- Bopomofo: ㄈㄛˊ ㄍㄨㄤ ㄕㄢ
- Gwoyeu Romatzyh: Forguangshan
- IPA: [fwǒ.kwáŋ.ʂán]
Southern Min
- Hokkien POJ: Hu̍t-kong-san

Fo Guang Shan (FGS; Chinese: 佛光山; pinyin: Fó guāng shān; lit. 'Buddha's Light Mountain') is an international Chinese Mahāyāna Buddhist organization and monastic order based in Taiwan that practices Humanistic Buddhism whose roots are traced to the Linji school of Chan Buddhism. The headquarters, Fo Guang Shan Monastery, is located in Dashu District, Kaohsiung, and is the largest Buddhist monastery in Taiwan. The organization is also one of the largest charity organizations in Taiwan. The organization's counterpart for laypeople is known as the Buddha's Light International Association.

Founded in 1967 by Hsing Yun, the order promotes Humanistic Buddhism and is known for its efforts in the modernization of Chinese Buddhism. The order is famous for its use of technology and its temples are often furnished with the latest equipment. Hsing Yun's stated position for Fo Guang Shan is that it is an "amalgam of all Eight Schools of Chinese Buddhism" (Chinese: 八宗兼弘; pinyin: bāzōng jiānhóng). The Fo Guang Shan order has several associated colleges, among them Fo Guang University in Taiwan and University of the West in the United States, which offers undergraduate and postgraduate degrees in both Buddhist Studies and secular fields.

In Taiwan, Hsing Yun is popularly referred to as one of the "Four Heavenly Kings" and Fo Guang Shan is considered one of the "Four Great Mountains" or four major Buddhist organizations of Taiwanese Buddhism, along with Dharma Drum Mountain, Tzu Chi, and Chung Tai Shan.

== History ==
In 1967, Hsing Yun purchased more than 30 hectares in Dashu Township, Kaohsiung County as the site for the construction of a monastery. The groundbreaking ceremony was held on 16 May 1967.

Fo Guang Shan has embarked on many construction projects, including university buildings, shrines, rectories, retirement homes, and a cemetery. In 1975, Fo Guang Shan's iconic 36-metre tall statue of Amitābha Buddha was consecrated. In 1981, 15 years after its establishment, the Great Hero Hall was built. During these times, many other Fo Guang Shan temples outside the order's mother monastery were also built.

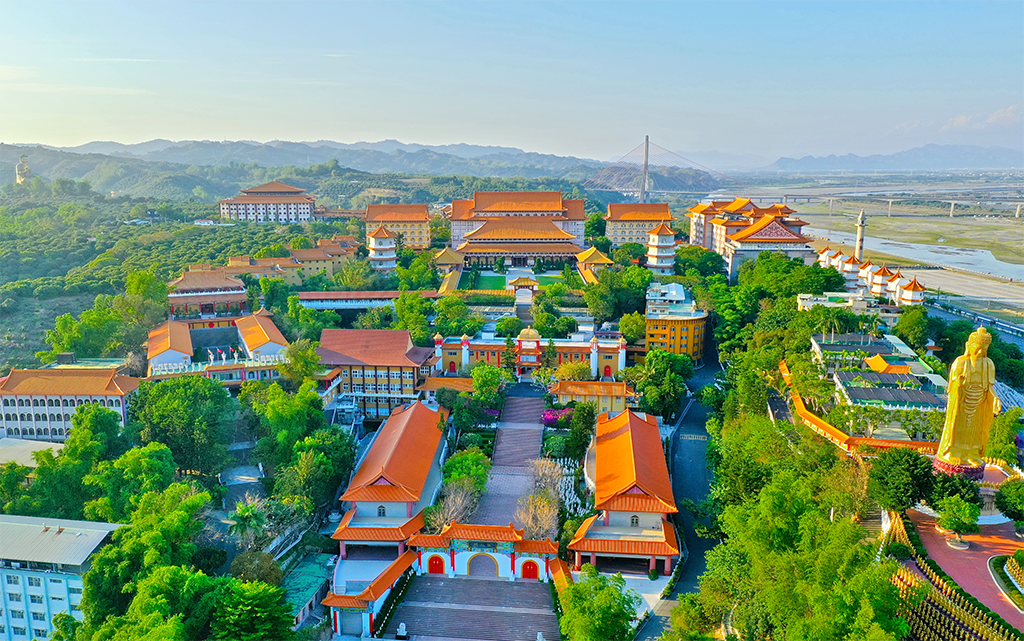
An aerial view of Fo Guang Shan Monastery, the headquarters of the order.

In May 1997, Hsing Yun announced that he would close the mountain gate of Fo Guang Shan to the general public. His reason in closing the monastery was to give monastics the cloistered atmosphere they need for their Buddhist practice. In practice, many Chinese monasteries have also closed their mountain gates to give a cloistered atmosphere to the temple residents. At the end of 2000, then President Chen Shui-bian of the Republic of China (Taiwan) and government officials from Kaohsiung visited Fo Guang Shan, bringing with them the wish from their constituents that Fo Guang Shan reopen its mountain gate. After due consideration, Fo Guang Shan decided to reopen the monastery to some extent, thereby providing the public a place to practice Pure Land Buddhism. On top of its headquarters being the largest monastery in Taiwan, it has a network of over 300 branches throughout Taiwan.

In the 2010s, Fo Guang Shan began establishment in mainland China, focusing more on charity and Chinese cultural revival rather than Buddhist propagation in order to avoid conflict with the Chinese Communist Party (CCP), which opposes organized religion. Fo Guang Shan's presence in China increased under the leadership of CCP general secretary Xi Jinping after he started a program to revive traditional Chinese faiths.

As of 2017, the order had over 1,000 monks and nuns, and over 1 million followers worldwide, with branches in fifty countries.

On 5 February 2023 founder Hsing Yun died at his residence at the age of 95 in Kaoshiung, Taiwan. His funeral took place on 12 February 2023 in the presence of Taiwan President Tsai Ing-wen and Premier Chen Chien-jen.

== Activities ==
Temples and organizations have been established in 173 countries throughout the world, and now encompasses more than 3,500 monastics. The organization emphasizes education and service, maintaining universities, Buddhist colleges, libraries, publishing houses, translation centres, Buddhist art galleries, teahouses, and mobile medical clinics. It has also established a children's room, retirement home, high school and television station.

=== Social and medical programs ===
The social and medical programs of Fo Guang Shan include a free medical clinic with mobile units that serve remote villages, an annual winter relief program organized to distribute warm clothing and food supplies to the needy, a children's and seniors' home, wildlife conservation areas to protect living creatures, and a cemetery for the care of the deceased. Fo Guang Shan's social work focuses primarily on helping the poor in remote areas.

The organization also runs orphanages, homes for the elderly, and drug rehabilitation programs in prisons. Fo Guang Shan has also been involved in some international relief efforts.

=== Educational programs ===
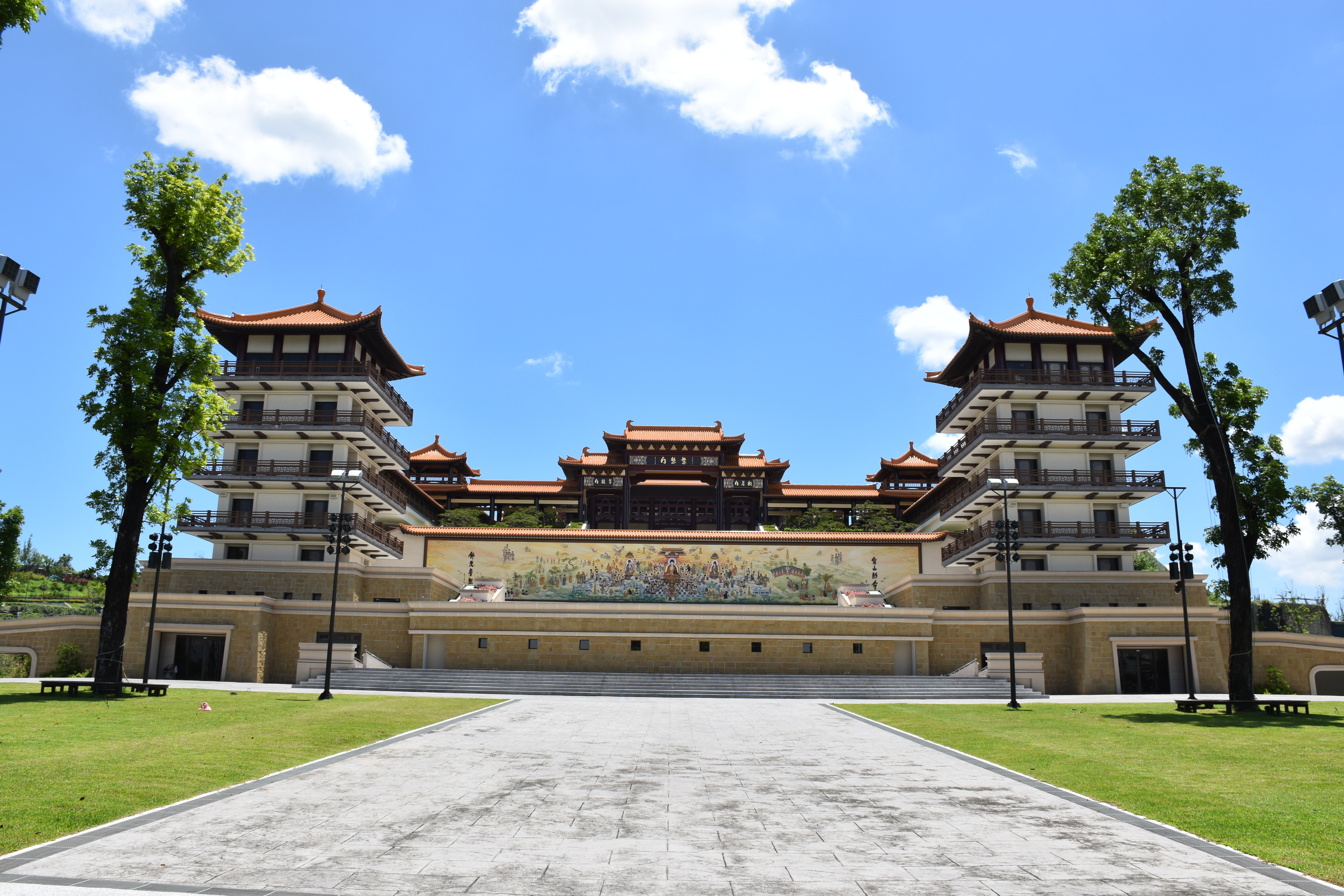
Fo Guang Shan's Sutra Repository, the home of the Institute of Humanistic Buddhism and library of over 50 editions of Buddhist canons.

In 1969, Fo Guang Shan began its first summer camp for college students.

The educational programs of Fo Guang Shan include four Buddhist colleges, three regular colleges, and various community colleges. The Fo Guang University was established in 2000. It focuses mainly on the humanities and social sciences. The Chinese Buddhist research institute is subdivided into four separate departments; a women's and men's college, and an international and English Buddhist studies department. Tuition fees and lodging are provided by Fo Guang Shan, free of charge. Other prominent universities the order has established include Nanhua University in Taiwan and the University of the West in the United States.

The organization also operates Pu-Men High School in Taipei, Jiun Tou Elementary and Junior High School, Humanities Primary and Junior High School, which provides regular curriculum for students. Fo Guang Shan also has nursery schools, kindergartens, and Sunday schools for children.

Along with Tzu Chi, Fo Guang Shan is the only major Buddhist organization in Taiwan that offers some form of strictly secular education, as opposed to purely religious.

In mainland China, Fo Guang Shan operates numerous cultural education programs and has built several libraries, even having gotten several books published through state controlled media.

=== Fo Guang Shan Buddha Museum ===
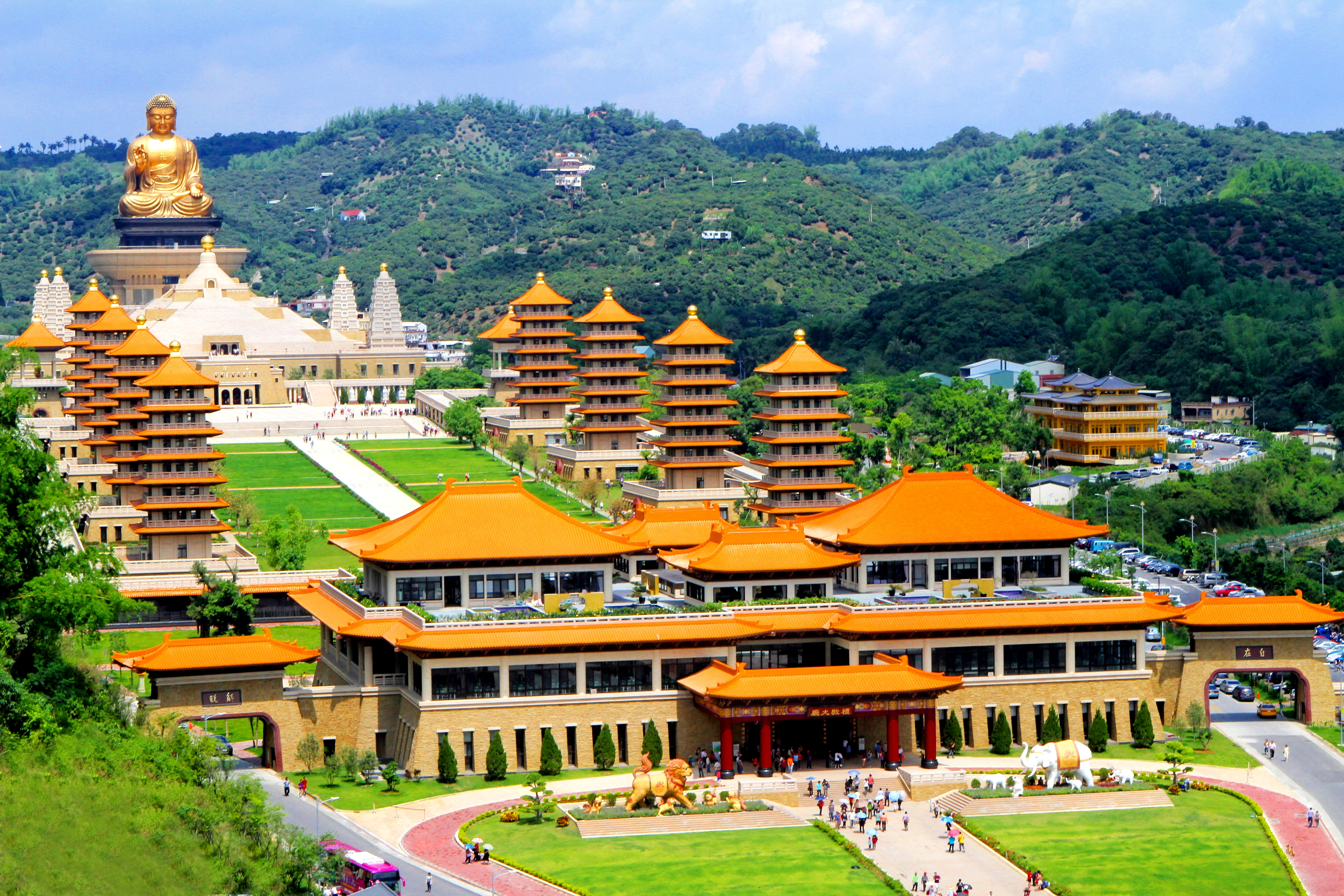
Fo Guang Shan Buddha Museum

Building plans for the Fo Guang Shan Buddha Museum (formerly called the Buddha Memorial Center) started with support from the Taiwanese government. The museum's Jade Buddha Shrine is purported to hold tooth relics of the historic Buddha. The site is situated immediately adjacent to the main monastery and covers more than 100 hectares. The complex faces east and is built along a central axial line. Beyond the Welcoming Hall are eight Chinese-styled pagodas on either side of the main avenue leading up to the Bodhi Square, about which are statues of the Buddha's main disciples and of the founders of the principal schools of Chinese Buddhism. The path leads onto the Memorial Hall, which holds several shrines including the Jade Buddha Shrine. Above the hall are four stupas that symbolize the Four Noble Truths. Standing behind but separate from it, there is an enormous seated metal Shakyamuni Buddha 108 meters high. The Center was opened at an international ceremony on 25 December 2011 and the first anniversary celebrated on Christmas Day 2012.

== Governance ==
=== Board of directors ===
In 1972, Hsing Yun established a nine-member council, known as the Fo Guang Shan Religious Affairs Committee, later renamed the Fo Guang Shan Board of Directors. These nine members govern and oversee the operations of the order through making appointments to various departments and other temples from within the order's network. Each of the nine members are elected prior to the resignation, death, or the ending of a term of an abbot. Once elected by members of Fo Guang Shan, the votes are openly counted. The nine members then nominate their next abbot, who in practice was chosen by Hsing Yun personally. Eight members of the council are ordained monastics, and one is a non-voting layperson.

== Proselytizing ==
In mainland China the order focuses strongly on cultural exchange rather than religion to introduce Buddhist ideas, as proselytizing is illegal in China.

Fo Guang Shan's approach to Dharma propagation focuses on simplifying Buddhism in order to make it more appealing to the masses. The organization is known for utilizing modern marketing techniques and preaching methods such as the use of laser shows and multimedia displays. Fo Guang Shan temples have no entrance fee, and do not allow many of the practices commonly found in other Chinese temples, such as fortune-telling or the presence of sales vendors. Despite the popularity of the organization, Fo Guang Shan has received criticism for being "too focused on commercialism, expanding its membership base, and building large temples."

== Abbots and directors ==
Hsing Yun
(1967–1985)

Hsin Ping
(1985–1995)

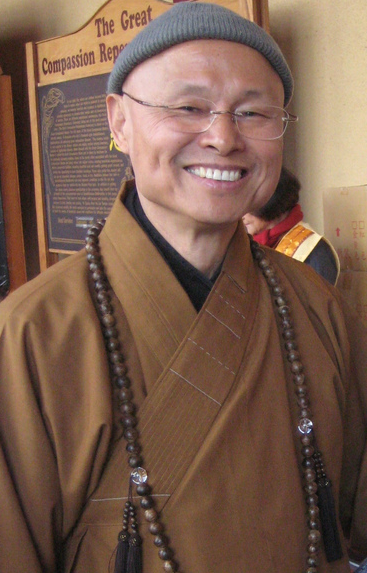
Hsin Ting
(1997–2005)

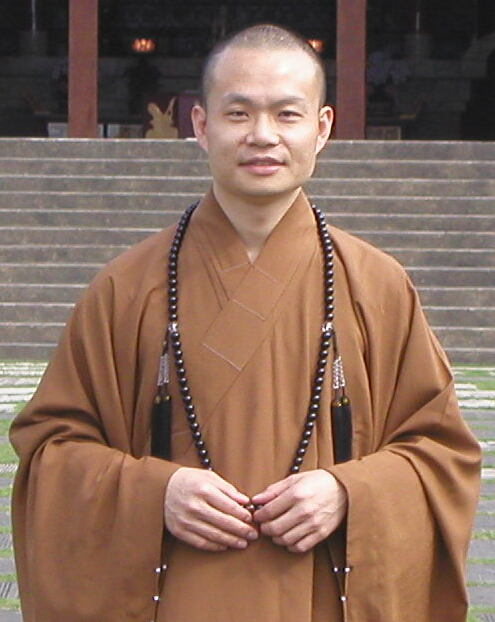
Hsin Pei
(2005–2013)

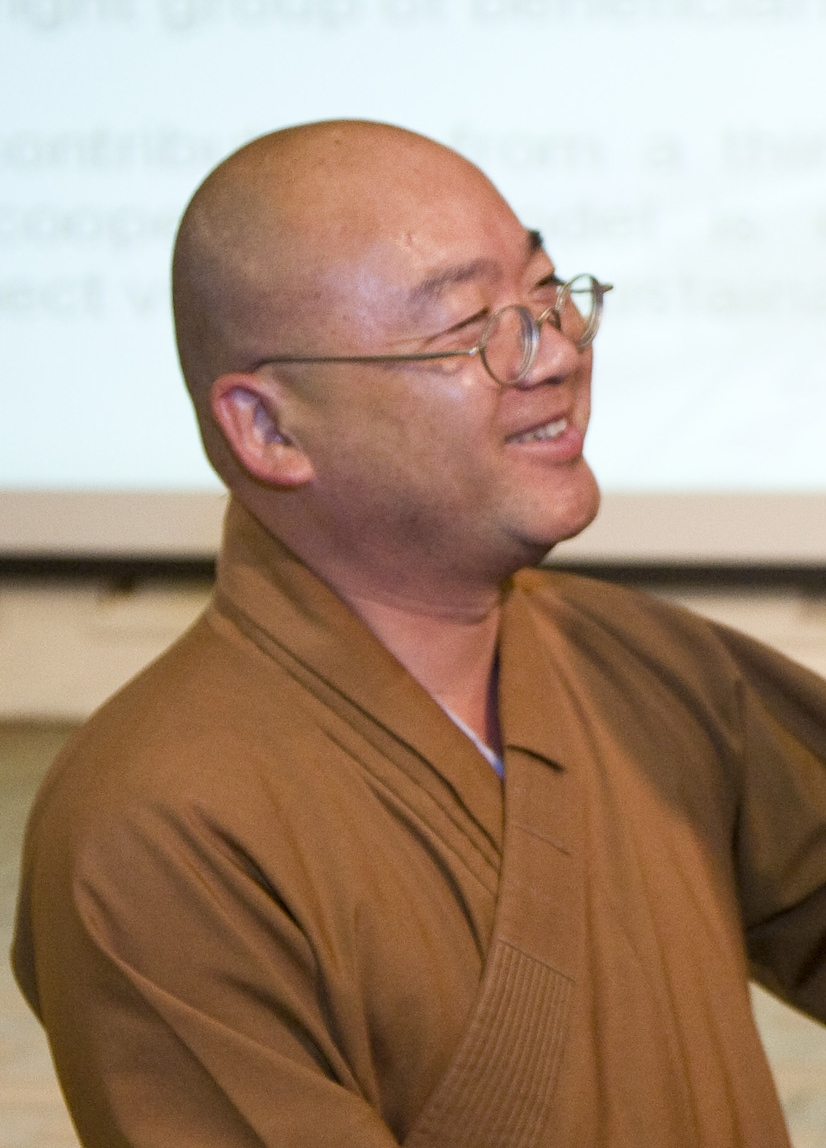
Hsin Bau
(2013–present)

== Branches ==
- Fo Guang Shan Mabuhay Temple, Philippines
- Zu Lai Temple, Cotia, Brazil
- Chung Tian Temple, Queensland, Australia
- Hsi Lai Temple, California, US
- Nan Hua Temple, South Africa
- Nan Tien Temple, Berkeley, Australia
- Fo Guang Shan Temple, Auckland, New Zealand
- Fo Guang Shan Temple, Toronto, Canada
- Guang Ming Temple, Central Florida, US
- London Fo Guang Shan Temple, UK

== See also ==
- Buddhism in Taiwan
- Buddha's Light International Association
- Beautiful Life Television

== Bibliography ==
- Chandler, Stuart (2002). Globalizing Chinese Culture, Localizing Buddhist Teachings: the Internationalization of Foguangshan, Journal of Global Buddhism 3, 46–78
- Chandler, Stuart (2004). Establishing a Pure Land on Earth: The Foguang Buddhist Perspective on Modernization and Globalization. Honolulu: University of Hawaii Press
