= Hsin Ting =

Taiwanese Buddhist monk (born 1944)

Hsin Ting 心定
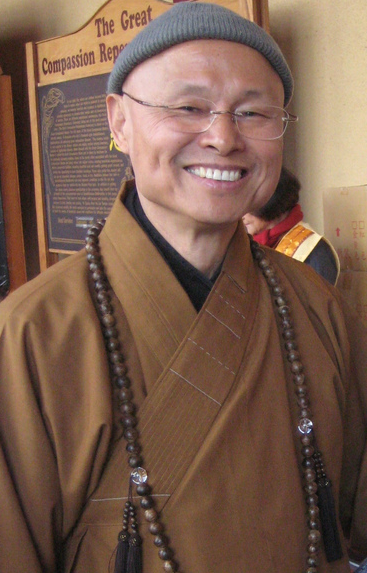
- Hsin Ting in 2012
- Title: Most Venerable

Personal life
- Born: February 2, 1944 (age 82) Yunlin County, Taiwan

Religious life
- Religion: Buddhism
- School: Fo Guang Shan
- Dharma names: Zhi Du (智度; Novice name); Hui Hsi (慧熙; Outer name)

Senior posting
- Teacher: Hsing Yun
- Predecessor: Hsin Ping
- Successor: Hsin Pei

Hsin Ting (Chinese: 心定和尚; pinyin: Xīndìng Héshàng; Pe̍h-ōe-jī: sim-tēng hô siōng; born February 2, 1944) is a Buddhist monk from Taiwan and senior elder of the Fo Guang Shan order. He served as the third abbot and director of the order from 1997 to 2005. He served as acting abbot for three years after the death of his predecessor, Hsin Ping, in 1995. From 2004 to 2010, Hsin Ting served as the president of Buddha's Light International Association. Hsin Ting was later appointed the abbot of Tai Hua Temple in Bangkok, Thailand, assisting in overseeing the construction project for Fo Guang Shan's satellite branch temple in Southeast Asia.

== Biography ==
Hsin Ting was born in Yunlin County. He was born into a family of farmers and grew up in the country. In 1968, he became a monastic under Master Hsing Yun and took full ordination the following year in Keelung. Hsin Ting graduated from the Eastern Buddhist College and the India Research Institute of the Chinese Cultural University. He further received an honorary doctorate degree from the Fo Guang Shan-affiliated University of the West in Rosemead, California in 1998.

Prior to his abbotship, Hsin Ting held a variety of high posts, such as the secretary of Fo Guang Shan's Religious Affairs Committee, Managing Director of the Ilan Buddhist Society, President of the American Buddhist Youth Association, Vice President and later President of the BLIA chapter in Taiwan. He also served as abbot at Long Hua Temple in Malaysia, Hsi Lai Temple in California, Pu Men Temple in Taipei, and Pu Hsien Temple in Kaohsiung. Outside of Fo Guang Shan, Hsin Ting serves as a board member at the Humpty Dumpty Institute in New York City and as vice chair of the board of trustees at University of the West.

Upon the sudden death of Hsing Yun's eldest disciple and abbot, Venerable Hsin Ping, Hsin Ting was immediately promoted to the said position, and served the rest of Hsin Ping's term until 1997, when he was unanimously elected abbot that same year. His term as abbot ended in 2005 when Venerable Hsin Pei was elected to succeed him. Along with Master Hsing Yun, he regularly gives dharma lectures and presides over Buddhist ceremonies on behalf of Hsing Yun. To accommodate his visits to the United States, Hsin Ting became a United States citizen in 2010.

In 2011, Hsin Ting launched a personal Facebook page as well as a YouTube channel for the purposes of reaching out to younger Buddhists.

Buddhist titles
Preceded by Venerable Hsin Ping	Abbot and Director of Fo Guang Shan (As acting abbot); 1995 – 1997 (As abbot); 1997 – 2005	Succeeded by Venerable Hsin Pei
Preceded by Venerable Tzu Chuang	Hsi Lai Temple abbot 1989 – 1993	Succeeded by Venerable Tzu Chuang
Non-profit organization positions
Preceded by Wu Poh-hsiung	Buddha's Light International Association President; 2004 - 2010	Succeeded by Chen Miao-sheng
