= Hsing Yun =

Taiwanese Buddhist monk (1927–2023)

- 星雲
- Hsing Yun in 2009
- Title: Venerable Master (大師)

Personal life
- Born: Lee Kuo-shen (李國深); 19 August 1927 Yangzhou, Jiangsu, Republic of China
- Died: 5 February 2023 (aged 95) Fo Guang Shan Monastery, Dashu, Kaohsiung, Taiwan
- Education: Qixia Academy of the School of Vinaya
- Known for: Father of the modern Humanistic Buddhism movement in Taiwan

Religious life
- Religion: Buddhism
- Temple: Fo Guang Shan
- School: Linji school; Fo Guang Shan Lineage
- Lineage: 48th Generation
- Dharma name: Jinjue (今覺); Wuche (悟徹)

Senior posting
- Teacher: Shi Zhikai (釋志開)

Chinese name
- Traditional Chinese: 星雲
- Simplified Chinese: 星云
Transcriptions
Standard Mandarin
- Hanyu Pinyin: Xīngyún
- Bopomofo: ㄒㄧㄥ ㄩㄣˊ
- Gwoyeu Romatzyh: Shingyun
- Wade–Giles: Hsing-yün
Southern Min
- Hokkien POJ: Seng-hûn

Lee Kuo-shen
- Traditional Chinese: 李國深
- Simplified Chinese: 李国深
Transcriptions
Standard Mandarin
- Hanyu Pinyin: Lǐ Guóshēn
- Bopomofo: ㄌㄧˇ ㄍㄨㄛˊㄕㄣ
- Gwoyeu Romatzyh: Lii Gwoshen
- Wade–Giles: Li3 Kuo2-shen1

Hsing Yun (Chinese: 星雲; pinyin: Xīng Yún; 19 August 1927 – 5 February 2023) was a Chinese Buddhist monk, teacher, and philanthropist based in Taiwan. He was the founder of the Fo Guang Shan Buddhist monastic order as well as the layperson-based Buddha's Light International Association. Hsing Yun was considered a major proponent of Humanistic Buddhism and one of the most influential teachers of modern Taiwanese Buddhism. In Taiwan, he was popularly referred to as one of the "Four Heavenly Kings" of Taiwanese Buddhism, along with his contemporaries: Master Sheng-yen of Dharma Drum Mountain, Master Cheng Yen of Tzu Chi and Master Wei Chueh of Chung Tai Shan.

== Biography ==
Hsing Yun was born Lee Kuo-shen (pinyin: Lǐ Guóshēn) in 1927 in Jiangdu village (modern day Yangzhou), Jiangsu Province in the Republic of China. Hsing Yun's first exposure to Buddhism came from his grandmother, a practicing Buddhist and meditator. Just prior to monastic life, he had accompanied his mother to Nanjing to search for his missing father but they were unsuccessful. In 1938 he entered the monastic life at the age of 12, ordaining as a novice at Qixia Temple under Zhikai, where he received the novice name Jinjue. He received the upasampadā vinaya precepts under Ruoshun at the same temple in 1941 and received the dharma name Wuche.

Shortly after taking the full precepts, Hsing Yun was first inspired by Buddhist modernism in 1945 while studying at Jiaoshan Buddhist College. There he learned about Buddhist teacher Taixu's calls for reform in Buddhism and the Sangha. At a certain point, he adopted the name "Hsing Yun"—"nebula" in Chinese—to reflect his new philosophy. He fled mainland China to Taiwan in 1949 following the communist victory in the civil war but was arrested along with several other Buddhist monastics. Hsing Yun and the others were released after 23 days, and he then spent the next several years developing a large following and founding numerous temples. In 1966, Hsing Yun bought some land in Kaohsiung and started building a large monastery. After partial completion, the temple opened in 1967 and would later become the headquarters of the Fo Guang Shan Buddhist organization.

Hsing Yun's Fo Guang Shan Buddhist order is a proponent of "Humanistic" Buddhism, and Hsing Yun himself was the abbot of the order until his resignation in 1985. Following his resignation, Hsing Yun founded the Buddha's Light International Association (BLIA) as a layperson based Humanistic Buddhist organization.

Hsing Yun was an early proponent of propagating Buddhism through means including choirs, lecture tours, summer camps, newspapers, radio, and other modern media. In the 1950s, he started the first island-wide dharma propagation tour.

Fo Guang Shan eventually grew to become one of the most significant social actors in Taiwan; the organization has established several schools and colleges, and runs orphanages, homes for the elderly, and drug rehabilitation programs in prisons. Fo Guang Shan has also been involved in some international relief efforts.

Fo Guang Shan entered mainland China in the early 21st century, focusing more on charity and Chinese cultural revival rather than Buddhist propagation in order to avoid conflict with the Chinese government, which opposes proselytizing. Fo Guang Shan's presence in China increased under the premiership of General Secretary Xi Jinping after he started a program to revive traditional Chinese faiths. According to Hsing Yun, his goal in mainland China was to work with the mainland government to rebuild China's culture following the destruction of the Cultural Revolution, rather than promote Buddhism in the mainland.

The headquarters of Fo Guang Shan in Kaohsiung is currently the largest Buddhist monastery in Taiwan. On top of that, the order has a network of over 300 branches throughout Taiwan, as well as several branches worldwide in at least fifty countries, including the United States, Australia, South Africa, and Brazil.

== Politics ==
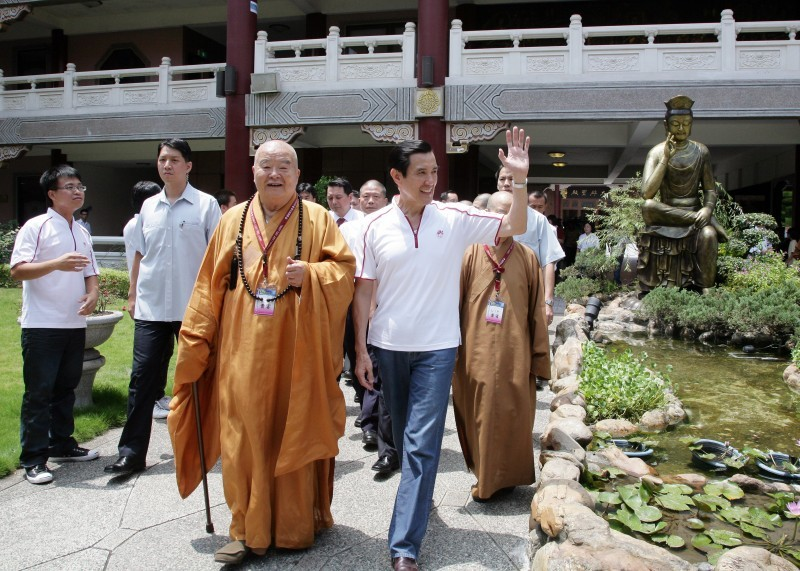
Hsing Yun with President Ma Ying-jeou in 2010; Hsing Yun was a supporter of the Kuomintang and gave his endorsement to Ma in the 2008 presidential election.

In Taiwan, Hsing Yun was notable for his activity in political affairs, particularly as a supporter of the One-China policy as well as government legislation supported by the Kuomintang, and was criticized for his views by those in favor of Taiwan independence and by religious figures, as being overtly political and "considerably far afield from traditional monastic concerns". During the 2008 presidential election, Hsing Yun publicly endorsed Kuomintang candidate Ma Ying-jeou. During the second World Buddhist Forum in 2009, Hsing Yun asserted that there are "no Taiwanese" and that Taiwanese "are Chinese". During the 2016 presidential election campaign, Hsing Yun caused considerable comment when he compared DPP candidate Tsai Ing-wen to the Chinese goddess Mazu, commenting that those traits would probably help Tsai be elected president, which she eventually was. To dispel rumors of party switching, Hsing Yun publicly gave his endorsement to KMT candidate Hung Hsiu-chu, who eventually withdrew from the race. Despite his Kuomintang partisanship, Hsing Yun was generally known to be respected by politicians of both parties.

He encouraged reconciliation between China and the Dalai Lama, but tried hard to avoid causing rifts between him and his organisation and the Chinese government.

== Illness and death ==
On 26 December 2011, Hsing Yun suffered a minor ischemic stroke, his second in that year. In his older years Hsing Yun began suffering from numerous health issues, including diabetes and near blindness.

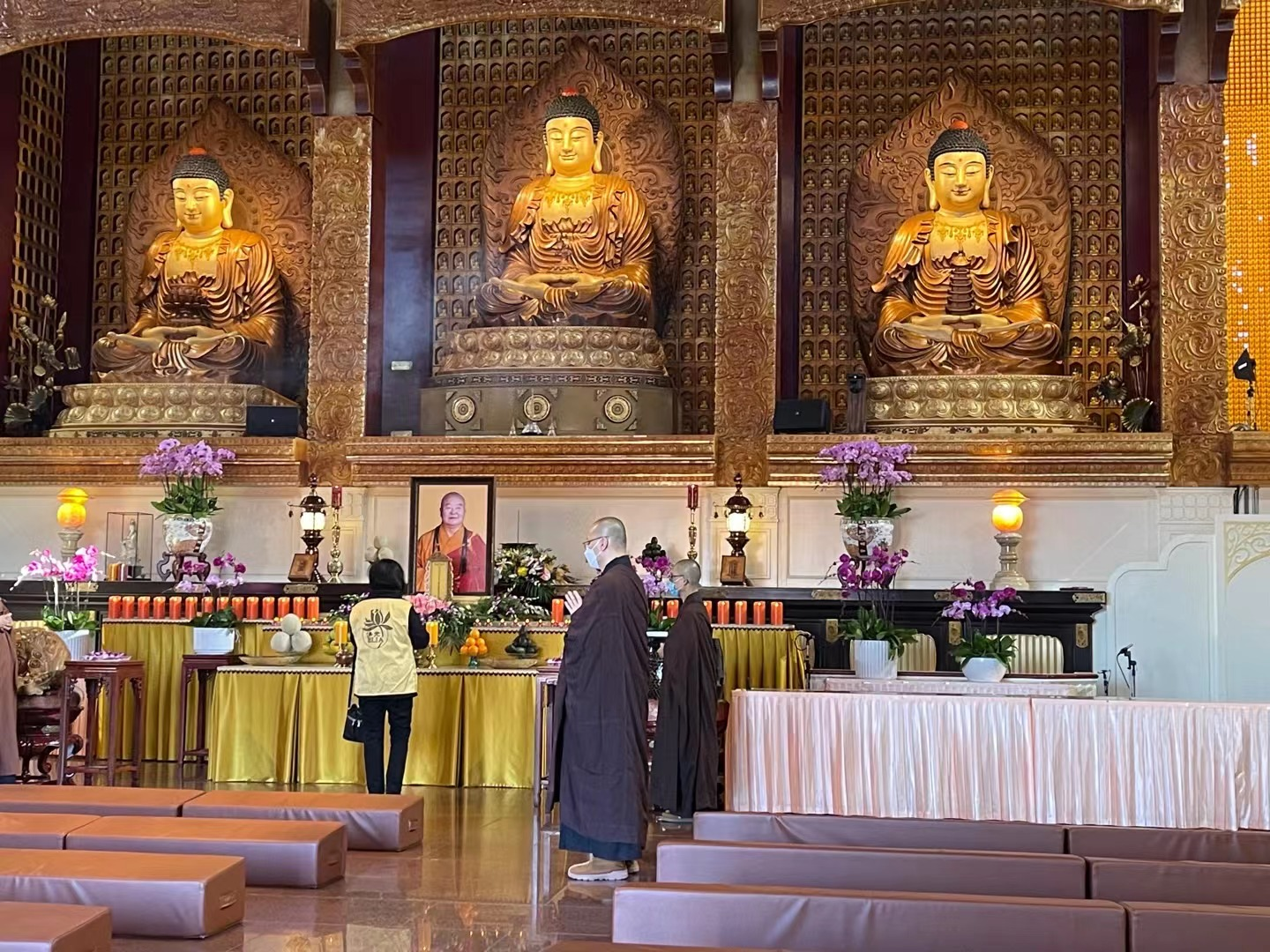
A memorial altar to Hsing Yun at Hsi Lai Temple after his death

Hsing Yun died at his residence in Fo Guang Shan monastery on the afternoon of 5 February 2023, after years of unstable health. He was 95 (97 according to East Asian age reckoning), and had spent 85 years of his life as a monastic.

The next day his body was placed in a seated position inside a dome-like container in the shape of the Parinirvana Stupa in Kushinagar, India. His body was placed upon a dais inside the Cloud Dwelling Building where he lay in state for seven days while visitors paid their respects.

Hsing Yun's funeral was held on 13 February, with President Tsai Ing-wen, Premier Chen Chien-jen, KMT chairman Eric Chu, and Kaohsiung mayor Chen Chi-mai in attendance. His remains were cremated at Daxian Temple in nearby Tainan, Baihe District. His urn was returned to Fo Guang Shan's Longevity Memorial Park the same evening. His cremated remains and sarira were interred inside the Patriarch's Shrine nearby the Fo Guang Shan monastery campus. In March 2026, his remains were portioned into twelve smaller stupas and presented to twelve Fo Guang Shan branch temples across Asia, North America, South America, Europe, and Oceania.

== Awards ==
In 2008, Hsing Yun was awarded the honorary Doctor of Humane Letters (L.H.D.) from Whittier College.

On the morning of 13 February 2023, President Tsai Ing-wen conferred a posthumous presidential citation upon Hsing Yun, extolling his many achievements.

== General and cited references ==
- Chandler, Stuart (2004). Establishing a Pure Land on Earth: The Foguang Buddhist Perspective on Modernization and Globalization. Honolulu: University of Hawaii Press.
- Chia, Jack Meng-Tat (2015). "Toward a Modern Buddhist Hagiography Telling the Life of Hsing Yun in Popular Media", Asian Ethnology 74 (1), 141–165
- Kimball, Richard L. (2000). "Humanistic Buddhism as Conceived and Interpreted by Grand Master Hsing Yun of Fo Guang Shan". Hsi Lai Journal of Humanistic Buddhism 1: 1–52.

Buddhist titles
Preceded by None	Abbot and Director of Fo Guang Shan; 1967–1985	Succeeded by Hsin Ping
