= John Crook (ethologist) =

British ethologist (1930–2011)

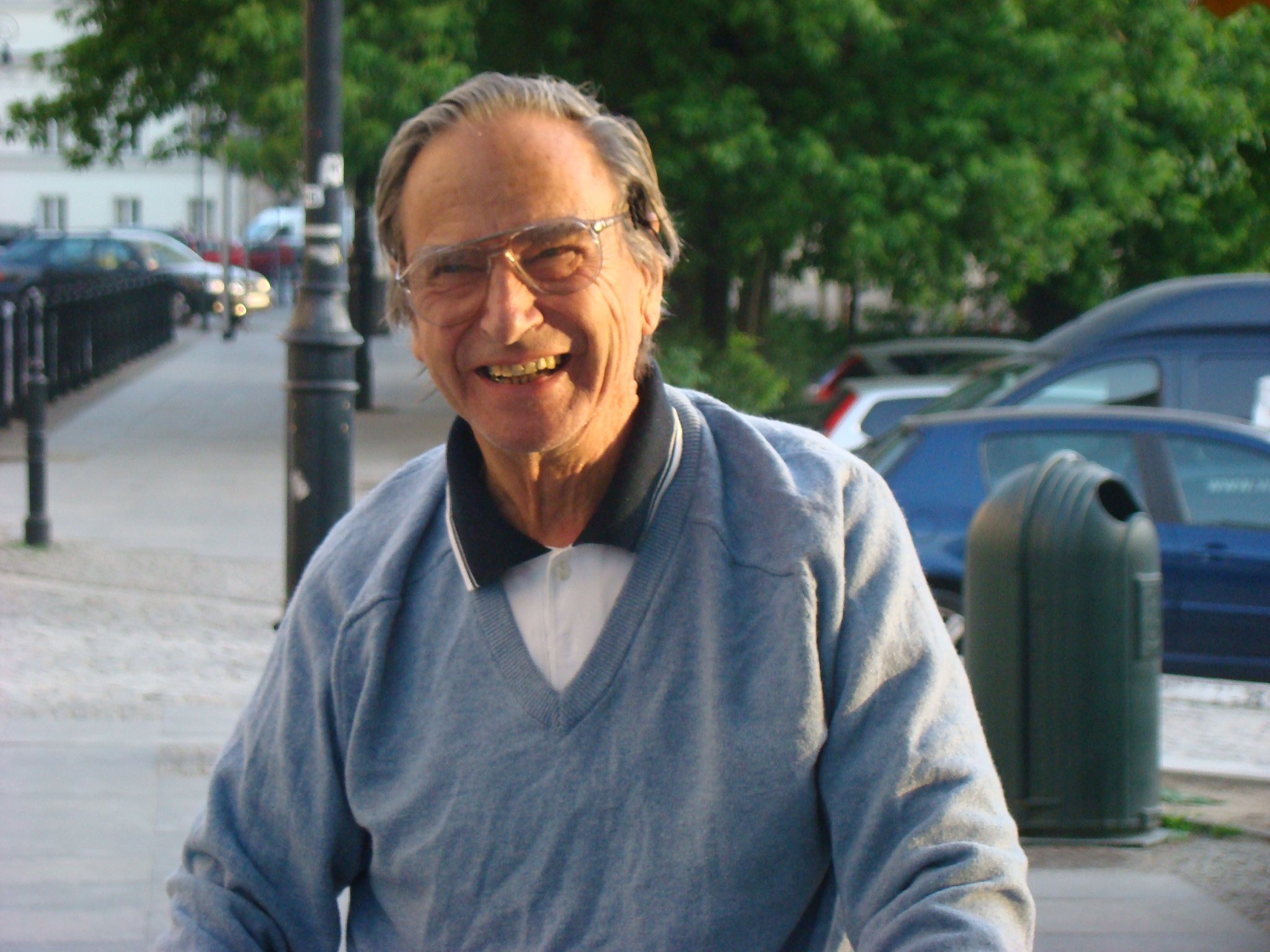

John Hurrell Crook (27 November 1930 – 15 July 2011) was a British ethologist who filled a pivotal role in British primatology.

As Reader in Ethology (animal behaviour) in the Psychology Department of University of Bristol, he led a research group studying social and reproductive behaviour in birds and primates throughout the 1970s–80s, turning to the socio-psychological anthropology of Himalayan peoples in the 1990s. In his later years he was the Teacher of the Western Chan Fellowship.

== Early life ==
He was educated at Oakmount School, Southampton and Sherborne School, Dorset.

He completed his national service in Hong Kong, where he first encountered Chan Buddhism.

== Academic career ==
Crook was a pioneer in the early development of socio-ecology, adding this dimension to ethology which was then dominated by the ideas of "Niko" Tinbergen and Konrad Lorenz. His student paper on the gulls of Southampton Water while at University of Southampton, led to his doctoral study at Jesus College, Cambridge of the weaver birds (Ploceidae) of West Africa, supervised by William Homan Thorpe and Robert Hinde. This was followed by further research in India, the Seychelles Islands and East Africa. His theoretical interpretation subsequently contributed to David Lack's discussion of the behavioural component in avian population research. His fieldwork was further supported by laboratory experimentation on the endocrinal basis for the behaviour observed in the field.

After moving to Bristol University, he collaborated with Professor K.R.L. Hall in establishing a centre for primate studies, extending socio-ecological principles to primates, supervising doctoral projects and leading field research in Ethiopia on geladas and in Morocco on the Barbary macaque, subsequently developed by Robin Dunbar and John Deag respectively.

His year as Fellow at the Center for Advanced Study in the Behavioral Sciences at Stanford University in California introduced him to the new techniques of humanistic psychotherapy. On return to Bristol, his students requested him to demonstrate these methods, leading to the creation of the Bristol Encounter Centre and to his teaching of the subject widely in the UK, especially based on workshops run at his retreat centre in mid Wales.

In 1977, Crook led an expedition to Zanskar in the Himalayas of Ladakh, a pilot study focussing on polyandry. For several years, he and colleagues led further expeditions studying the geology, agriculture, social and family life and monastic practices in this remote, high-altitude region. He later returned with James Low, a Tibetologist fluent in the texts and language, to study the lives of Buddhist hermits in the mountains.

== Buddhism ==
Retiring early, Crook began practising Zen Buddhism in intensive retreats taught at Dharma Drum Retreat Center in New York by Chan Master Sheng-yen of Dharma Drum Mountain, Taiwan, who in 1993 transmitted to him the authority to teach Chan Buddhism. Forming the Western Chan Fellowship with colleagues, Crook developed a programme of retreats adapted to Western Zen practitioners.

Crook published around a hundred scientific papers in ornithology, ethology and evolutionary psychology, and several books focussing on consciousness and Zen practice. His last work was World Crisis and Buddhist Humanism (New Age Books, Delhi 2009).

He died on 15 July 2011, shortly after a gathering of many former students and colleagues in Somerset to celebrate his life. Dr Innes Cuthill, Professor of Behavioural Ecology at Bristol University, described him as "a pivotal figure in the rise of British primatology and socio-ecology".

== Honours ==
- Osman Hill Medal. Primate Society of Great Britain. 1992.
- Fellow. Center for Advanced Study in the Behavioral Sciences, Stanford University. 1968–69.
- Honour plaque. Jammu and Kashmir Academy of Art, Culture and Languages. 2003.

== Publications ==
- John H. Crook (Editor), Social behaviour in Birds and Mammals: Essays on the Social Ethology of Animals and Man. Academic. 1970.
- R. P. Michael and John H. Crook (Editors), Comparative Ecology and Behaviour of Primates. Academic Press Inc, 1973. ISBN 978-0-12-493450-4
- John H. Crook, The Evolution of Human Consciousness. Oxford University Press, 1980. ISBN 978-0-19-857187-2
- John H. Crook, Catching a Feather on a Fan: Zen Retreat with Master Sheng Yen. Element Books, 1991. ISBN 978-1-85230-194-1
- John H. Crook and David Fontana, Space in Mind: East-West Psychology & Contemporary Buddhism. Thorsons/Element, 1993. ISBN 978-1-85230-154-5
- John H. Crook and Henry Osmaston, Himalayan Buddhist Villages: Environment, Resources, Society and Religious Life in Zangskar, Ladakh. Bristol Classical Press, 1994. ISBN 978-0-86292-386-0
- John H. Crook and James Low, The Yogins of Ladakh: A Pilgrimage Among the Hermits of the Buddhist Himalayas. Motilal Banarsidass, 1997. ISBN 978-81-208-1462-2
- John H. Crook, Hilltops of the Hong Kong Moon. Minerva. 1997.
- John H. Crook, Illuminating Silence. Watkins. London. 2002.
- John H. Crook, Simon Child, Zarko Andricevic, Max Kalin, and Master Sheng-yen. Chan Comes West. North Atlantic Books, 2005. ISBN 978-1-55643-543-0
- John H. Crook, The Koans of Layman John. Lulu. 2009. ISBN 978-1-4092-6766-9
- John H. Crook, World Crisis and Buddhist Humanism. End Games: Collapse or Renewal of Civilisation. New Age Books, 2009. ISBN 978-81-7822-325-4
