= Guo Xing =

Taiwanese Chan Buddhist monk

Ven. Guo Xing Fa Shi (born 1953; Chinese: 果醒法師) is one of the Dharma heirs of Chan Master Sheng-yen.

== Biography ==
Guo Xing was born in Taiwan and ordained as a monk in 1986 after previously studying Chan under Master Sheng-yen for about two years. Since then he committed himself to service in the Dharma Drum Mountain sangha. He entered solitary retreat in Thailand in 1991. He also studied Theravada meditation in that country. After returning to Taiwan, he resumed service at Dharma Drum Mountain.

For 20 years he assisted Master Sheng-yen in leading at least fifty meditation retreats in Taiwan, Southeast Asia, and the United States. These included the first 49-day retreat at Dharma Drum Retreat Center at Pine Bush, New York in 2000 – in which Master Sheng-yen passed his Dharma transmission to two of his prominent Western disciples, Dr Simon Child and Max Kalin. He has served in various posts and offices in the Dharma Drum Mountain organization, including meditation counselor at Nung Chan Monastery in Taiwan, guiding instructor at Dharma Drum Sangha University, and director of Dharma Drum Mountain's Chan Hall.

Currently he is a resident teacher and abbot of Dharma Drum Retreat Center. He speaks Taiwanese, Mandarin, and English.

== See also ==
- Master Sheng-yen
- Dharma Drum Retreat Center
- Dharma Drum Mountain
