= Chi Chern =

Malaysian Buddhist monk

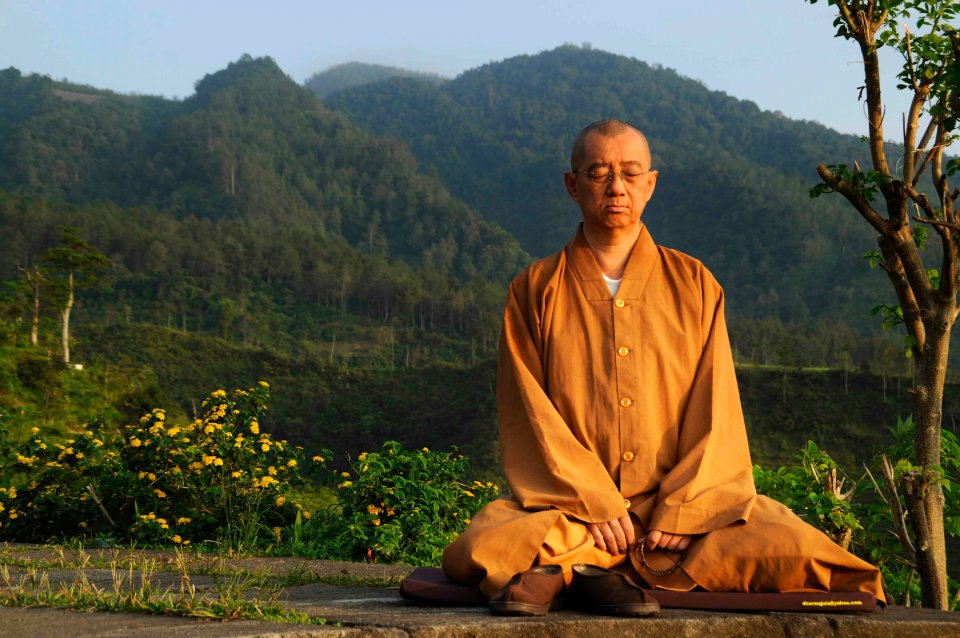
Chi Chern leading a retreat in Central Java, Indonesia

Chi Chern (Chinese: 繼程; pinyin: Jìchéng; Jyutping: Gai3 Cing4; Pe̍h-ōe-jī: Kè-thêng, birth name Zhōu Míngtiān, Chinese: 周明添; pinyin: Zhōu Míngtiān; Jyutping: Zau1 Ming4 Tim1; Pe̍h-ōe-jī: Chiu Bêng-thiam) (born in 1955) was the first appointed Dharma heir of renowned Chan Master Sheng-yen. He is also one of the most respected meditation teachers in Malaysia and Singapore. Born in Malaysia and ordained as a monk by Master Chuk Mor (Chinese: 竺摩; pinyin: Zhú Mó) in Penang, he later went to Taiwan to study at Fo Guang Shan Institute of Chinese Buddhism.

In 1980, he participated in four-weeks-retreats led by Sheng-yen. It was during this retreat that he had his deep spiritual experience. After his experience was confirmed by Sheng-yen, he went back to Malaysia and started to teach Buddhism. Five years later, he returned to Taiwan and received dharma transmission from Sheng-yen. His Dharma name is Chuan Xian Jian Mi ("transmitting the exoteric, seeing the esoteric").

Chi Chern Fa Shi currently resides in Malaysia and is the principal of the Malaysian Buddhist Institute.

== See also ==
- Sheng-yen
- Dharma Drum Mountain
