= Buddhism in Taiwan =

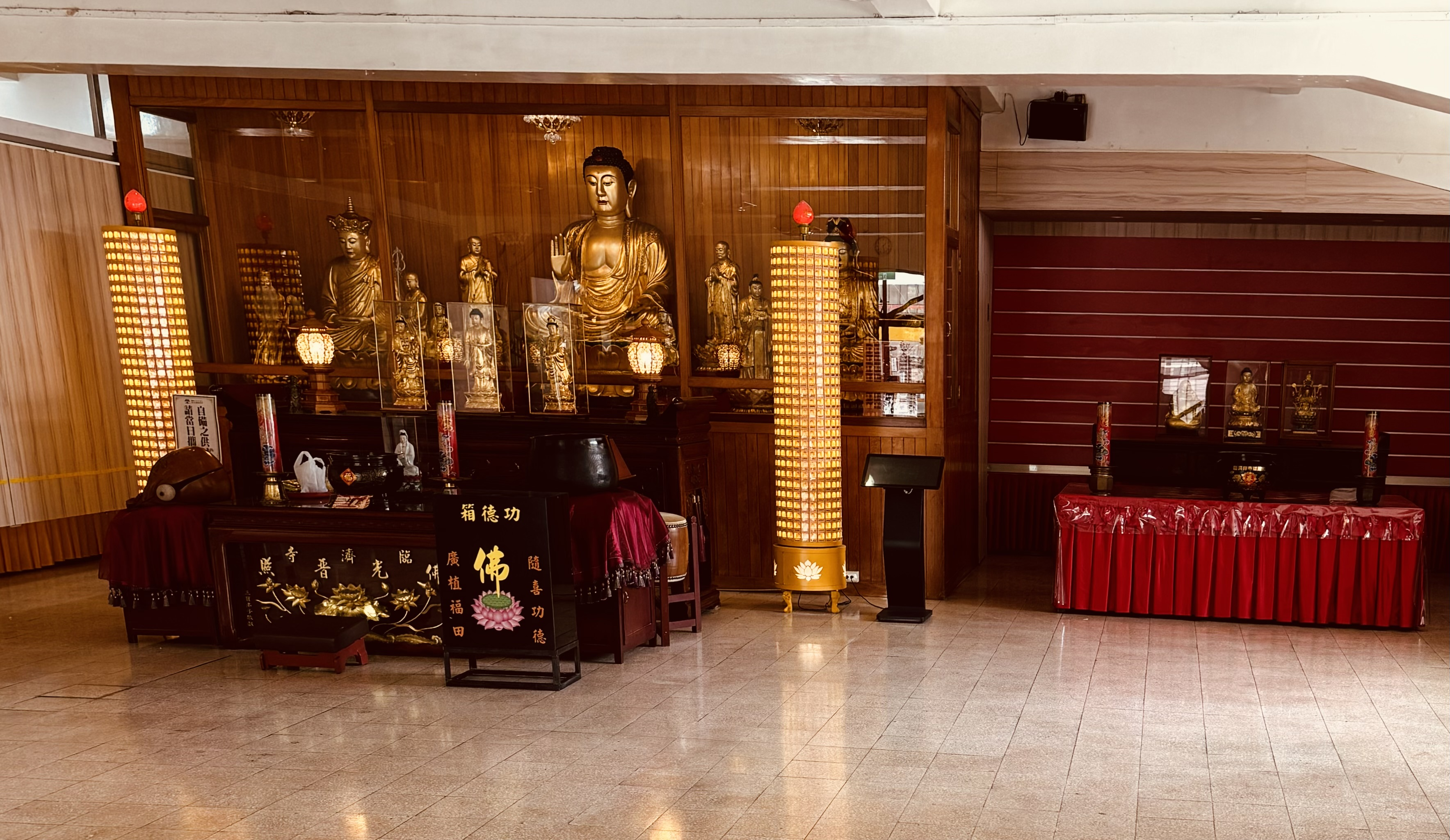
Linji Huguo Chan Temple, Taipei, Taiwan

Buddhism is one of the major religions in Taiwan. Taiwanese people predominantly practice Humanistic Buddhism, Confucian principles, Taoist traditions and local practices. Roles for religious specialists from both Buddhist and Taoist traditions exist on special occasions such as for childbirth and funerals. Of these, a smaller number identify more specifically with Chinese Buddhist teachings and institutions, without necessarily eschewing practices from other Asian traditions.

Following the Chinese Civil War, Buddhism experienced a rapid increase in popularity in Taiwan, attributed to Taiwan's economic miracle following the war and several major Buddhist organizations promoting modern values such as equality, freedom and reason, which was attractive to the country's growing middle class. Taiwanese Buddhist institutions are known for their involvement in secular society, including the providing of a number of public goods and services such as colleges, hospitals and disaster relief.

As of 2021 around 19.8% of the population believes in Buddhism.

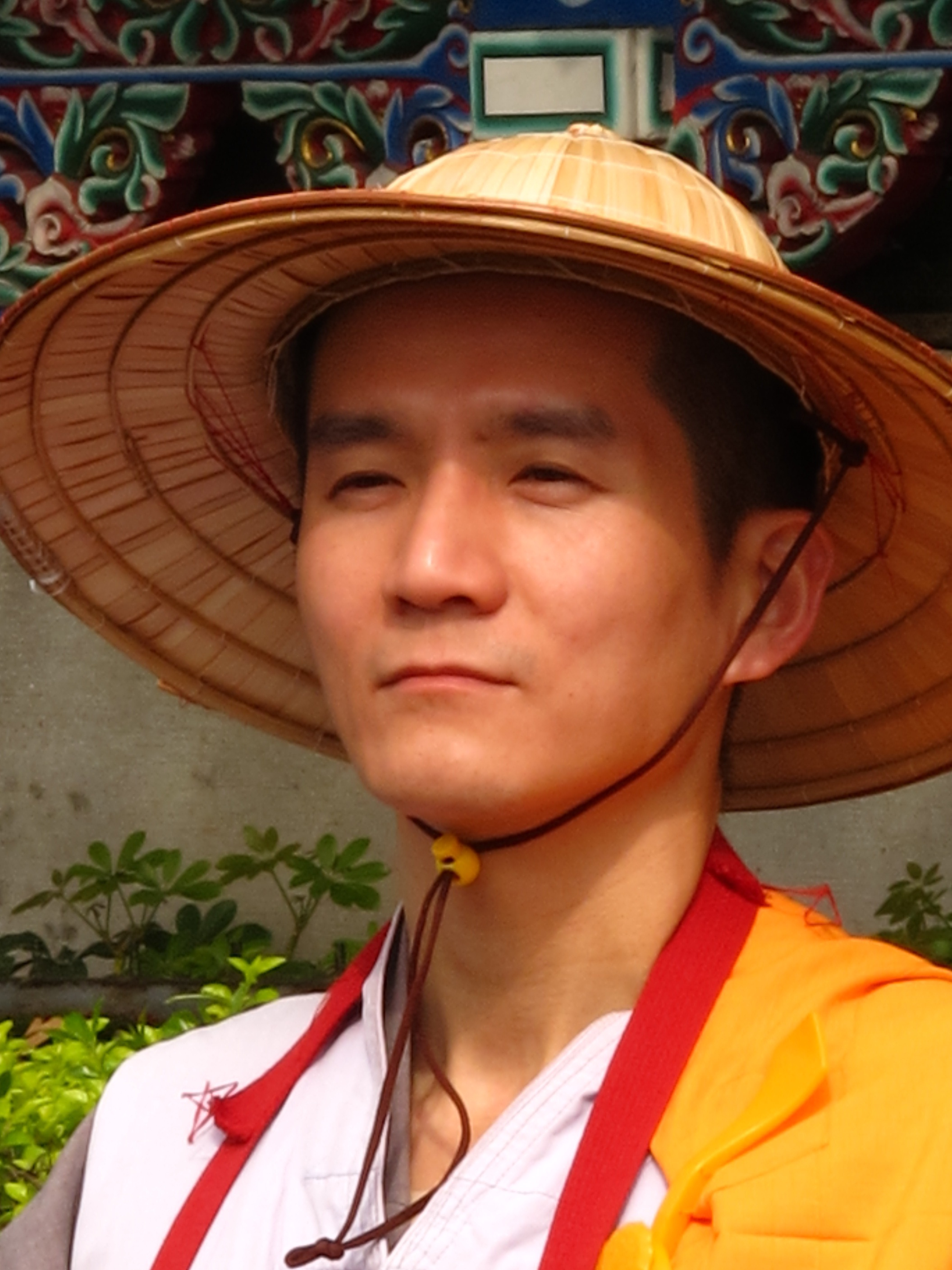
Taiwanese Buddhist monk with traditional robes and a bamboo hat

== Demography ==
Taiwanese government statistics distinguish Buddhism from Taoism, giving almost equal numbers for both. In 2005, the census recorded 8 million Buddhists and 7.6 million Taoists, out of a total population of 23 million. Many of Taiwan's self-declared "Taoists" actually observe the more syncretistic practices associated with Chinese traditional religion which is based on Buddhism. Self-avowed Buddhists may also be adherents of more localized faiths such as Yiguandao, which also emphasize Buddhist figures like Guanyin or Maitreya and espouse vegetarianism.

Distinguishing features of Taiwanese Buddhism is the emphasis on the practice of vegetarianism, the influence of Humanistic Buddhism, and the prominence of large centralized Buddhist organizations. Four Buddhist teachers who founded institutions that are particularly influential are popularly referred to as the "Four Heavenly Kings of Taiwanese Buddhism", one for each cardinal direction, with their corresponding institutions referred to as the "Four Great Mountains". They are:

- North (Jinshan): Master Sheng-yen (聖嚴, 1931–2009) of Dharma Drum Mountain (法鼓山)
- South (Dashu): Master Hsing Yun (星雲, 1927–2023) of Fo Guang Shan (佛光山)
- East (Hualien): Master Cheng Yen (證嚴, 1937–) of the Tzu Chi Foundation (慈濟基金會)
- West (Nantou): Master Wei Chueh (惟覺, 1928–2016) of Chung Tai Shan (中台山)

== History ==
=== Early years ===
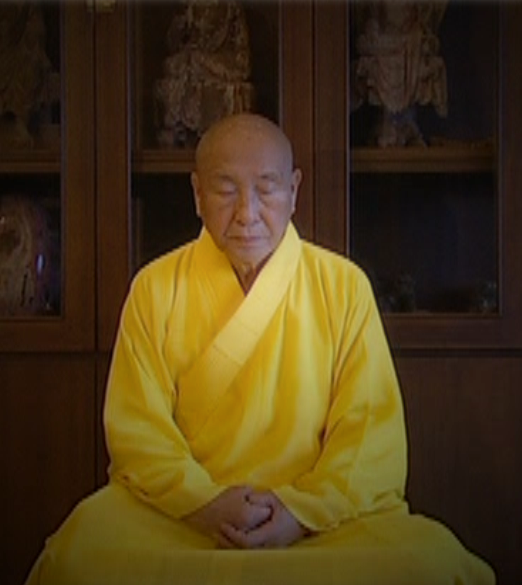
Wei Chueh, a traditional Chán Buddhist master in Taiwan.

Buddhism was brought to Taiwan in the era of Dutch colonialism by settlers from the Chinese provinces of Fujian and Guangdong. The Dutch, who controlled Taiwan from 1624 until 1663, discouraged Buddhism, since idol worship was punishable by public flogging and banishment by Dutch law at the time. In 1662, Koxinga drove the Dutch from Taiwan. His son Zheng Jing established the first Buddhist temple in Taiwan. During this period, Buddhist practice was not pervasive, with Buddhist monks only performing funeral and memorial services.

When the Qing dynasty took control of Taiwan in 1683, large numbers of monks came from Fujian and Guangdong provinces to establish temples, particularly those devoted to Guanyin, and a number of different Buddhist sects flourished. Monastic Buddhism, however, did not arrive until the 1800s.

=== Japanese period ===
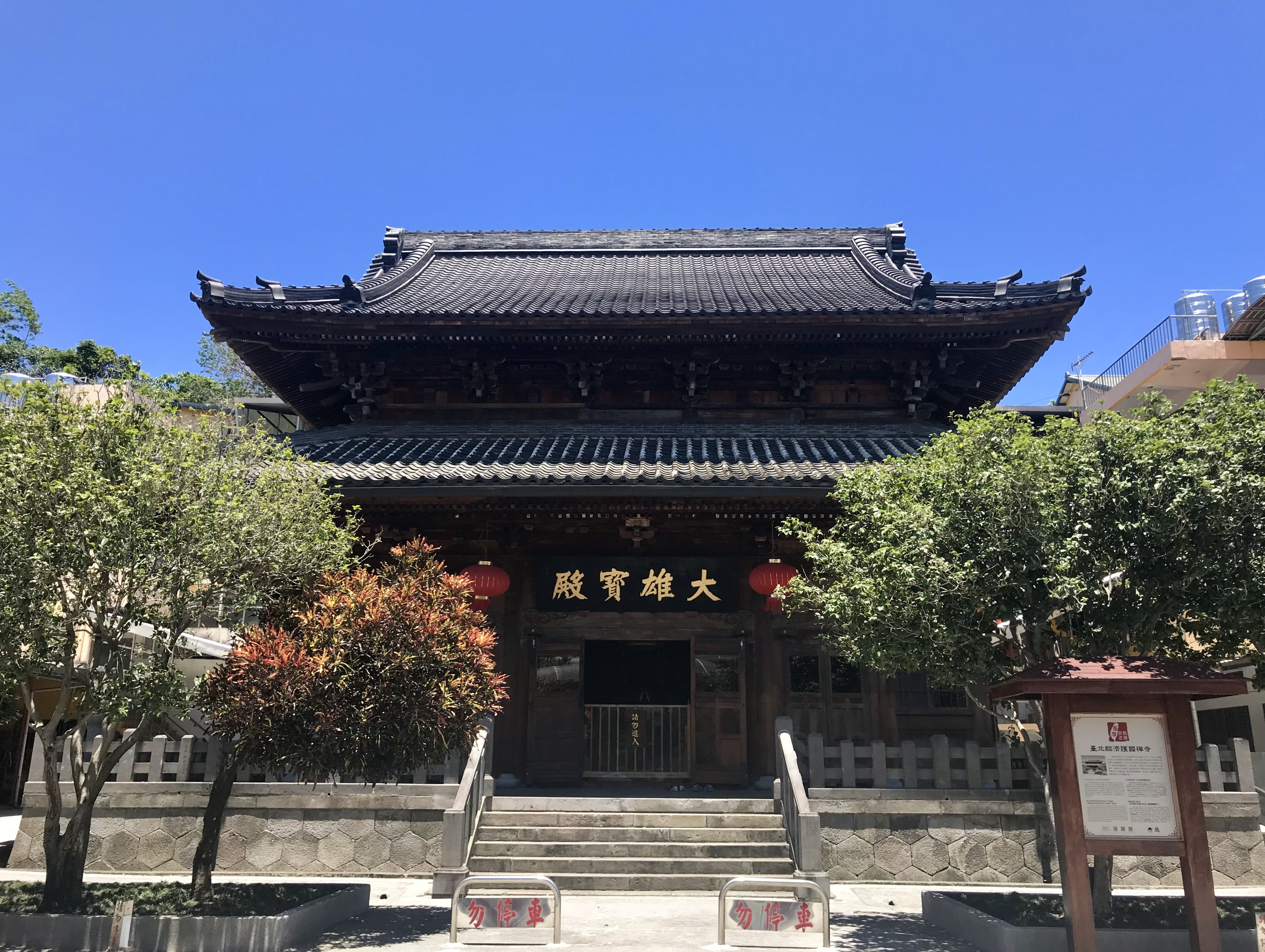
Linji Huguo Chan Temple is a Japanese Buddhist temple.

During the Japanese rule of Taiwan (1895–1945), many schools of Japanese Buddhism came to Taiwan to propagate their Buddhism teachings, such as Kegon (華厳宗), Tendai (天台宗), Shingon Buddhism (真言宗), Rinzai school (臨済宗), Sōtō (曹洞宗), Jōdo shū (浄土宗), Jōdo Shinshū (浄土真宗) and Nichiren Buddhism (日蓮宗). The total number of Japanese Buddhist groups that were introduced to Taiwan could be categorized into 14 sects under 8 schools. During the same period, most Taiwan Buddhist temples came to affiliate with one of four central temples, called "Four Holy Mountains" (台灣四大名山):

- North (Keelung): Yue-mei Mountain (月眉山), founded by Master Shan-hui (善慧)
- North (New Taipei): Guan-yin Mountain (觀音山), founded by Master Ben-yuan (本圓)
- Center (Miaoli): Fa-yun Temple (法雲寺), founded by Master Jue-li (覺力)
- South (Kaohsiung): Chao-feng Temple (超峰寺), also founded by Yi-min (義敏)

As a Japanese colony, Taiwan fell under the influence of Japanese Buddhism. Many temples experienced pressure to affiliate with Japanese lineages, including many whose status with respect to Buddhism or Taoism was unclear. (Emphasis on the Chinese folk religion was widely considered a form of protest against Japanese rule.) Attempts were made to introduce a married priesthood (as in Japan). These failed to take root, as emphasis on vegetarianism and/or clerical celibacy became another means of anti-Japanese protest.

=== World War II ===
With Japan's defeat in World War II, Taiwan fell under the control of Chiang Kai-shek's government, resulting in contrary political pressures. In 1949, a number of mainland monks fled to Taiwan alongside Chiang's military forces, and received preferential treatment by the new regime. During this period, Buddhist institutions fell under the authority of the government-controlled Buddhist Association of the Republic of China (中國佛教會). Originally established in 1947 (in Nanjing), it was dominated by "mainland" monks. Its authority began to decline in the 1960s, when independent Buddhist organizations began to be permitted; and especially since the 1987 lifting of martial law in Taiwan.

=== Post War Period ===
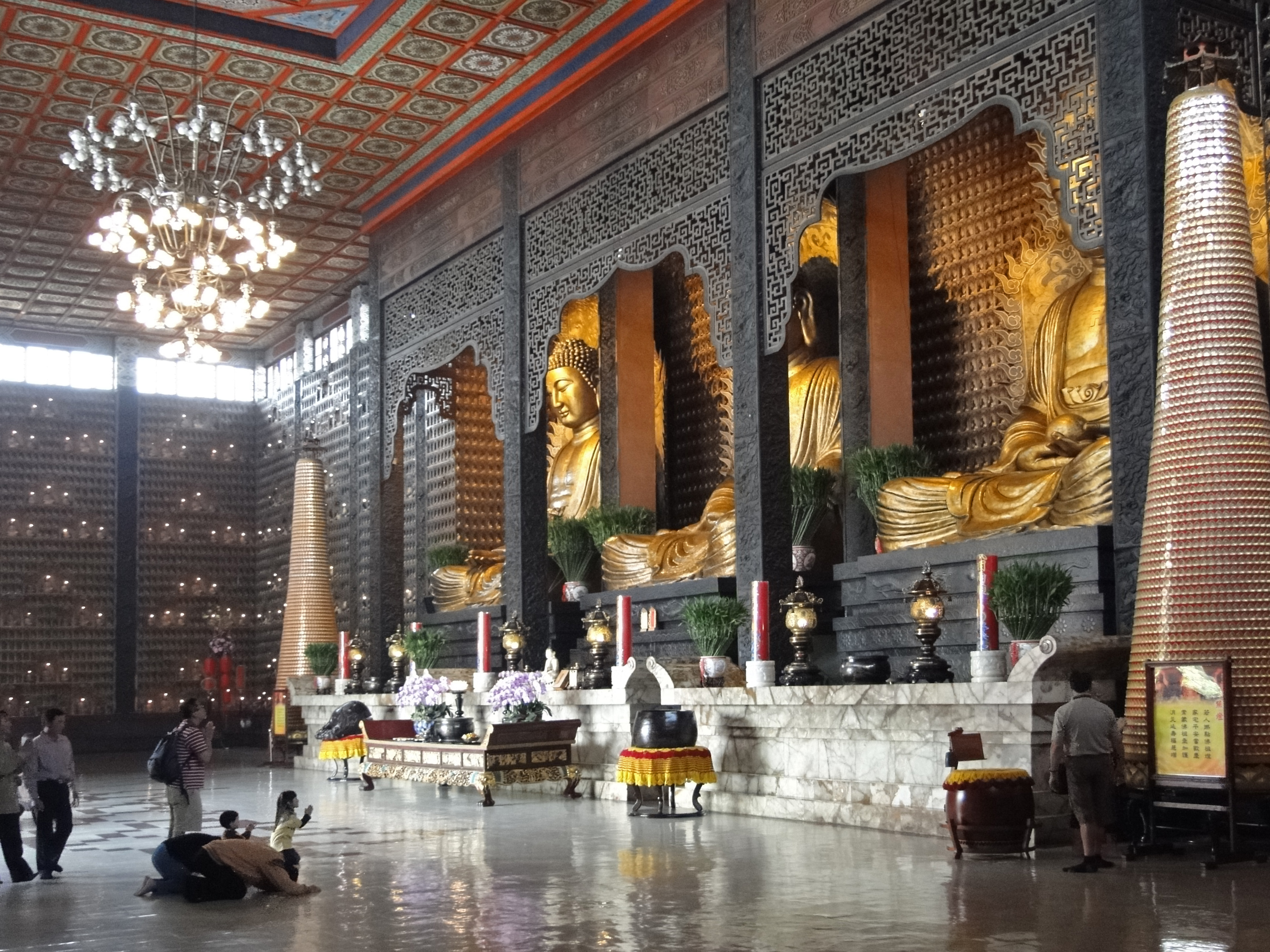
Main sanctuary of Fo Guang Shan Monastery near Kaohsiung

Buddhism experienced rapid growth in Taiwan following the war, which has been attributed to the immigration of several Buddhist teachers from the People's Republic of China after the defeat of the nationalists in the Chinese Civil War and the growth of Humanistic Buddhism (人間佛教). 'Humanistic Buddhism' promotes a direct relationship between Buddhist communities and the wider society. Also known as Socially Engaged Buddhism, its focuses on the improvement of society through participation in aspects such as environmental conservation. Humanistic Buddhism is the major distinguishing trait of modern Taiwanese Buddhism.

Humanistic Buddhism traces its roots to Chinese monk Venerable Taixu (1890–1947), who wanted to reform the continuous focus on ritual and ceremony. Taixu promoted more direct contributions to society through the Buddhist community and was a significant influence for Master Yin Shun, who is generally considered to be the figure who brought Humanistic Buddhism to Taiwan.

These two figures were the major influences of the Buddhist teachers that shaped modern Taiwanese Buddhism. One of the first private networks of Buddhist centers was that of Hsing Yun, who was directly inspired by Taixu. Hsing Yun first attained popularity through the new medium of radio broadcasts in the 1950s and later through publication of Buddhist audio on phonograph discs, leading to the founding of Fo Guang Shan in 1967. Another major figure was Master Cheng Yen, a direct student of Yin Shun, who founded Tzu Chi, which would become Taiwan's largest Buddhist organization and charity.

In the 1950s and 1960s, many Christian publications on Taiwan condemned Buddhism. A common evangelization strategy was for Christians to go to Buddhist religious sites to challenge Buddhists and distribute Christian literature.

In 1954, Venerable Nanting wrote, "All Buddhists, monastic and lay, should be fearful of the indifference and discrimination that Buddhism has suffered from the government, its oppression by a heretical and deviant religion, and the low regard in which it is held in the world."

During the 1980s, Buddhist leaders pressed Taiwan's Ministry of Education to relax various policies preventing the organization of a Buddhist university. The eventual result was that in the 1990s—flush with contributions made possible by Taiwan's "miracle economy"—not one but half a dozen such schools emerged, each associated with a different Buddhist leader. Among them were Tzu Chi University, Hsuan-Chuang University, Huafan University, Fo Guang University, Nanhua University, and Dharma Drum Buddhist College. The regulations of the Ministry of Education prohibit recognized colleges and universities from requiring religious belief or practice, and these institutions therefore appear little different from others of their rank. (Degrees granted by seminaries, of which Taiwan has several dozen, are not recognized by the government.) In a reversal of the older historical relationship, these Taiwanese Buddhists would later play a role in the revival of Buddhism in mainland China later in the century.

In 2001, Master Hsin Tao opened the Museum of World Religions in New Taipei. In addition to exhibits on ten different world religions, the museum also features "Avatamsaka World," a model illustrating the Avatamsaka Sutra.

=== Development of the Vajrayana schools ===
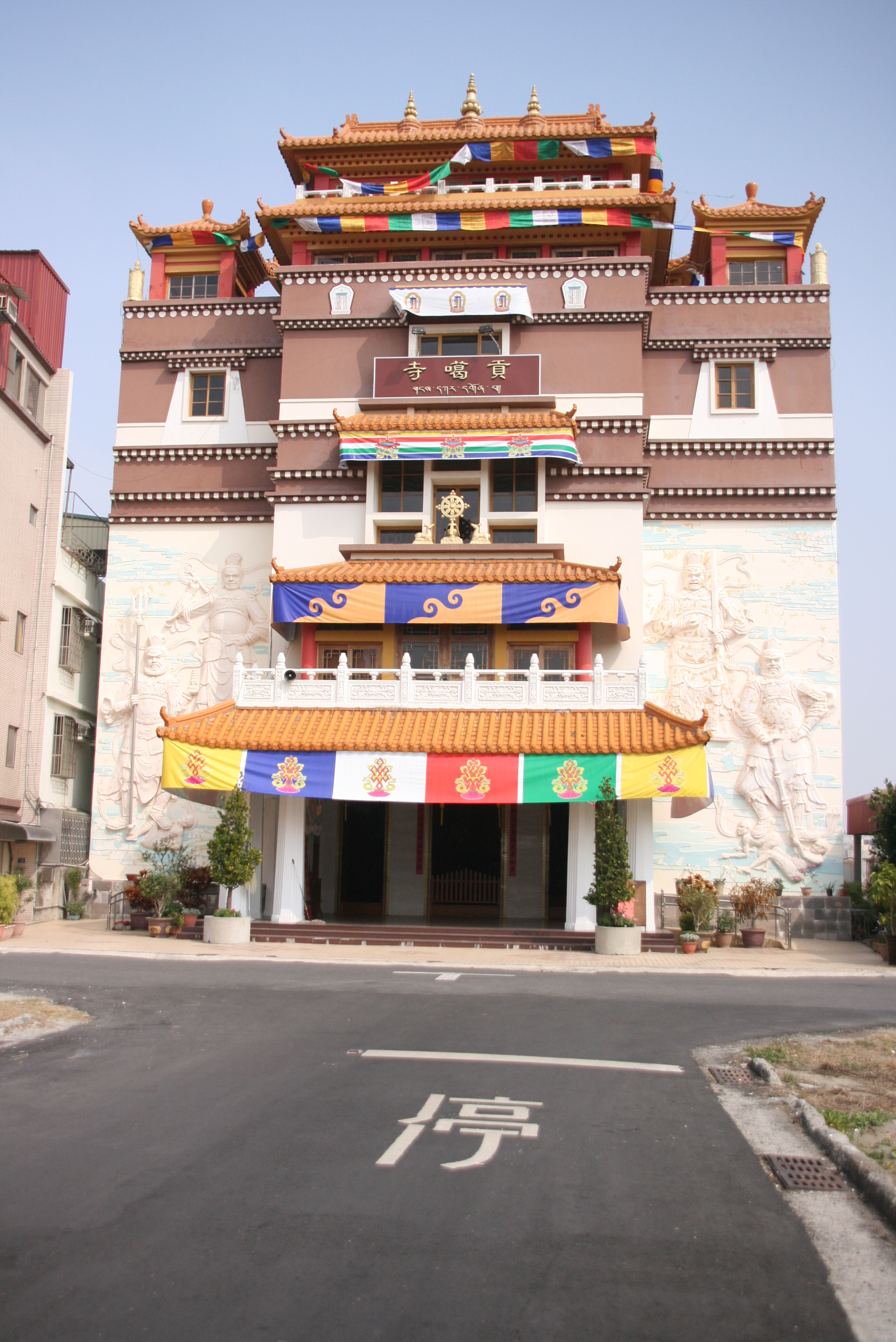
Konga Temple, a Tibetan Buddhist temple in Tainan.

In recent decades, Vajrayana Buddhism has increased in popularity in Taiwan as Tibetan lamas from the four major Tibetan schools (Kagyu, Nyingma, Sakya and Gelug) have visited the island, including the 14th Dalai Lama, who visited the island thrice in 1997, 2001 and 2009.

The Koyasan Shingon sect of Japan also maintains its own practice centers and temples in Taiwan, some of them historically established during the Japanese period of Taiwanese history, while others were established in the post-WWII era in order to re-establish an orthodox Esoteric Buddhist lineage that was long eliminated during the Tang dynasty.

The True Buddha School, founded in the late 1980s by Taiwanese native Lu Sheng-yen, is one of the more well known of the Vajrayana sects in Taiwan.

== Growth in the late 20th century ==
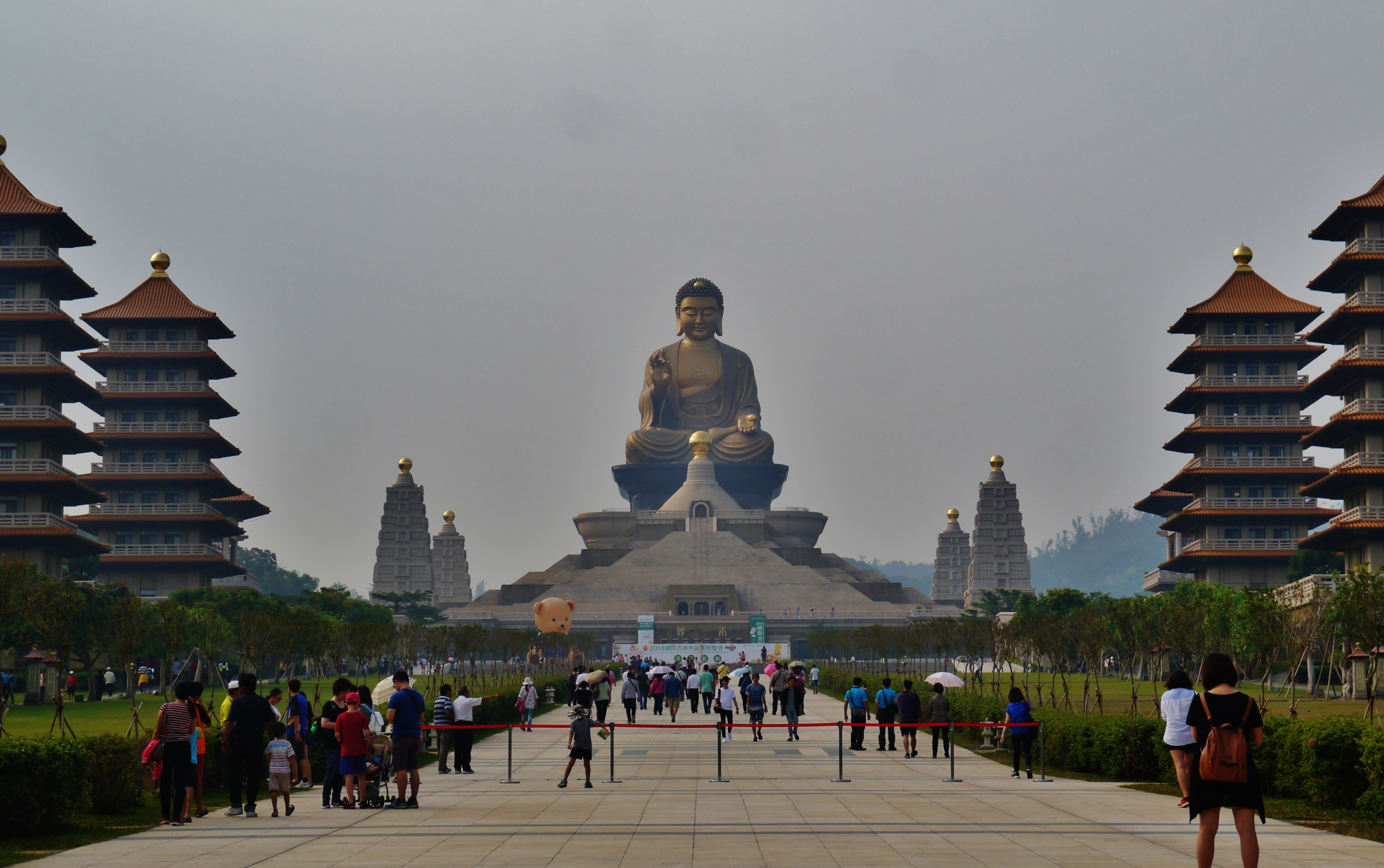
Main path at Fo Guang Shan Buddha Museum

Statistics provided by the Interior Ministry show that Taiwan's Buddhist population grew from 800,000 in 1983 to 4.9 million in 1995, a 600 percent increase. In contrast, the population grew about twelve percent over the same time period. Additionally, in the same period the number of registered Buddhist temples increased from 1,157 to 4,020, and the number of monks and nuns was up 9,300 monks and nuns, up from 3,470 in 1983.

Scholars attribute this trend to a number of unique factors in Taiwan, including the activity of the various charismatic teachers who were active during this time, as well as the migration of devout lay Buddhists fleeing religious persecution in Mainland China. On top of that, several officials in the government of Chiang Kai-Shek were devoted Buddhists who helped support Buddhism when the fleeing Buddhist leaders arrived in Taiwan. Other factors scholars cite for the rapid growth include a general search for identity among Taiwanese citizens, increased urbanization as well as a sense of isolation in an increasingly impersonal society.

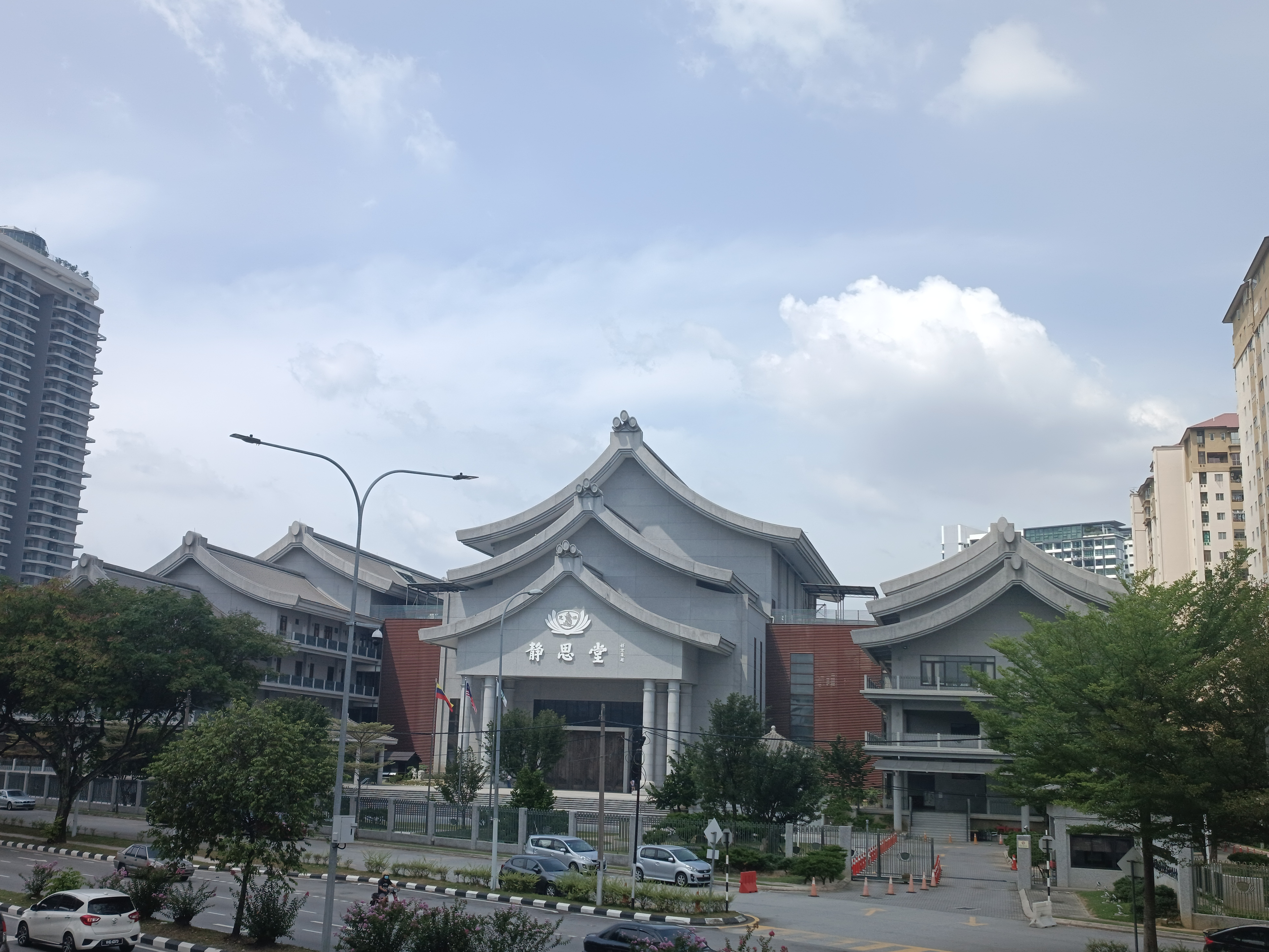
Main hall at Tzu Chi Foundation

The growth of Buddhism rose most sharply in the late 1980s when the Taiwanese government became much more liberalized. Aside from societal influences there have also been a number of developments when it comes to the Buddhist community. The modernization of Taiwan coincided with the rise of Humanistic Buddhism. The growth of Buddhism in Taiwan was spearheaded by a number of organizations developing during this period led by various teachers who took a socially engaged approach in accordance with Humanistic Buddhist philosophy. As Buddhist groups become more involved in people's everyday lives there has been a general push to make the teachings of Buddhism more relevant and applicable to modern- day issues such as environmental protection, human rights and stress management. These developments helped create an image of Buddhism as being highly relevant in the modern world to the Taiwanese population.

Rapid economic growth and general prosperity has also been an important factor for Buddhism in Taiwan. As people acquire time-saving goods such as cars and appliances, extra time can be allocated to an activity which can help provide meaning or a goal to people's lives. This has been speculated as being the case in Taiwan where people look for deeper satisfaction beyond the immediate and the materialistic. Economic prosperity has also meant that donations and volunteering have increased throughout a number of Taiwanese communities.

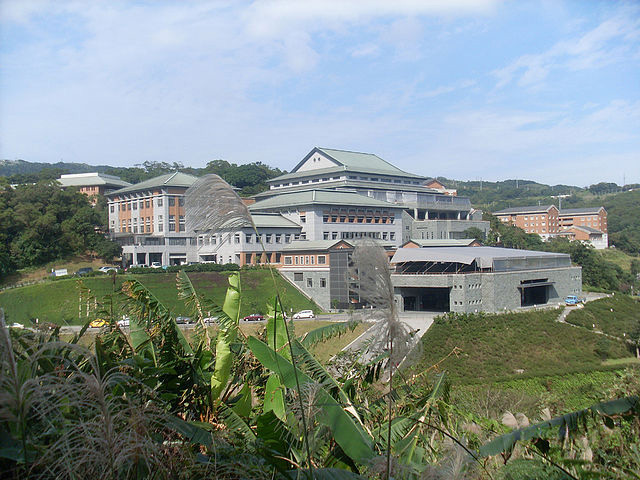
Full view of Dharma Drum Mountain Monastery

While other religious groups, such as Christian churches, took similar approaches and had many of the same societal benefits in Taiwan during this period of Buddhist resurgence, a major advantage Buddhism had was that it had long played a role in Chinese history and culture. Groups such as Christian churches were seen as foreign and therefore Buddhism had much greater appeal to the young people in Taiwan at the time who were looking for a sense of ethnic identity and to fill the ideological needs of the more socially conscious public as Taiwan modernized. Another advantage Buddhism had over other religious groups was that the growth of Buddhism in Taiwan was being led primarily by large Buddhist organizations such as Tzu Chi and Fo Guang Shan. Organizations such as these were headed by charismatic leaders such as the Four Heavenly Kings and the size of the organizations allowed for large scale fundraising and public events, giving the major Buddhist organizations an advantage in terms of resources and publicity. In addition, most of the contemporary Taiwanese Buddhist organizations leading the resurgence were known for their use of modern technology to appeal to the masses and some were known for championing popular progressive causes at the time.

Significant funding and a more liberal approach to religion allowed folk religions and Buddhism in particular to prosper in Taiwan during the post war era. This is in contrast to the severe persecution and restrictions Buddhism and religion faced in mainland China between 1949 and 1978. Buddhism, among other aspects, was seen as an aspect of Chinese culture that was holding the nation back. Many monks and nuns were forced to give up their monastic lives and become part general society. It wasn't until 1978 that Buddhism has been able to re-surface in mainland China. The much different environment in Taiwan allowed Buddhism to have a very significant religious presence in Taiwan since the late 20th century. Many scholars now consider Taiwan to be the center of Chinese Buddhism with many schools, temples and shrines established all over the island by many prominent Buddhist leaders.

== See also ==
- Buddhist modernism
- Buddhism in China
- Chinese Buddhism
- Four Great Mountains (Taiwan)
- Four Heavenly Kings (Taiwan)
- Humanistic Buddhism
- Religion in Taiwan

== Sources ==
- Chandler, Stuart. Establishing a Pure Land on Earth: The Foguang Buddhist Perspective on Modernization and Globalization. University of Hawaii Press, 2004.
- Government Information Office (Taiwan), Republic of China Yearbook, 2002.
- Hsing, Lawrence Fu-Ch'uan. Taiwanese Buddhism & Buddhist Temples/ Pacific Cultural Foundation: Taipei, 1983.
- Ho, Erling (5 September 2002). "Buddha Business". Far Eastern Economic Review.(article 2002.)
- Jones, Charles Brewer (1999). Buddhism in Taiwan: religion and the state, 1660–1990. University of Hawaii Press. ISBN 978-0-8248-2061-9.
- Laliberte, Andre. "The Politics of Buddhist Organizations in Taiwan: 1989-2003" RoutledgeCurzon, 2004.
- Madsen, Richard. Democracy's Dharma: Religious Renaissance and Political Development in Taiwan. University of California Press, 2007.
- David Schak and Hsin-Huang Michael Hsiao, « Taiwan's Socially Engaged Buddhist Groups », China perspectives [Online], 59 | May – June 2005, Online since 1 June 2008, connection on 2 September 2012. URL : Taiwan's Socially Engaged Buddhist Groups
- Buddhism in world cultures [electronic resource]: comparative perspectives / edited by Stephen C. Berkwitz (Santa Barbara : ABC-CLIO, 2006)
- A Macroscopic Study of Taiwanese Buddhist History
