= Guo Yuan (Chan monk) =

Chan Buddhist monk

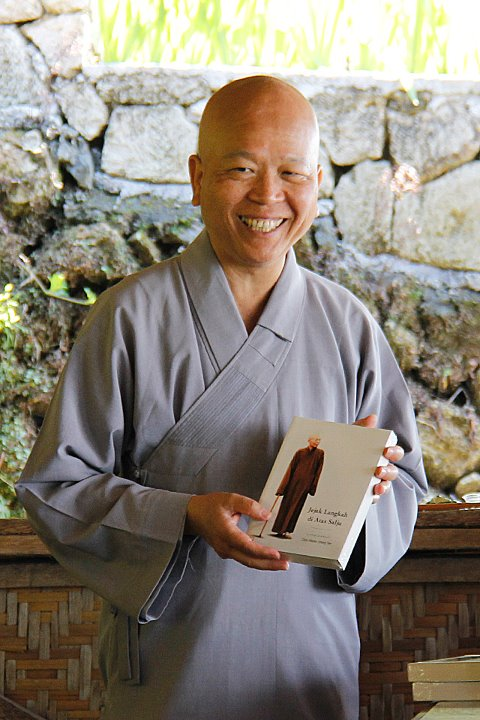
Guo Yuan in a retreat at Central Java, Indonesia

Guo Yuan (traditional Chinese: 果元; ; Vietnamese: Quả Nguyên; born 1950) is a Vietnamese Buddhist monk trained in Chan Buddhism. He is a senior disciple of Chan master Sheng-yen of Taiwan. In 1985 he first encountered Sheng-yen's teachings while attending a seven-day retreat in New York. He then decided to become a disciple before finally leaving his job in Toronto, Ontario, Canada, to become a monk in the Chan tradition. He was ordained in 1987 in Taiwan. He is active in Chan retreats in Dharma Drum Mountain.

== Biography ==
He studied Theravada Buddhism for a year in Thailand in 1991. Upon returning from Thailand, he was elected abbot of Dharma Drum Chan Meditation Center in Queens and Dharma Drum Retreat Center in Pine Bush, New York. His responsibilities included attending interfaith services, teaching meditation, and giving lectures on Buddhism. For over 20 years, he also accompanied and became translator to Sheng-yen in various Chan meditation retreats in the United States, the United Kingdom, Germany, Switzerland, Russia, and Mexico.

He is currently the director of the Dharma Drum Retreat Center in, Pine Bush, New York and is fluent in English, Cantonese Chinese, Mandarin Chinese and Vietnamese.
