= Nung Chan Monastery =

Monastery at Beitou District, Taipei, Taiwan

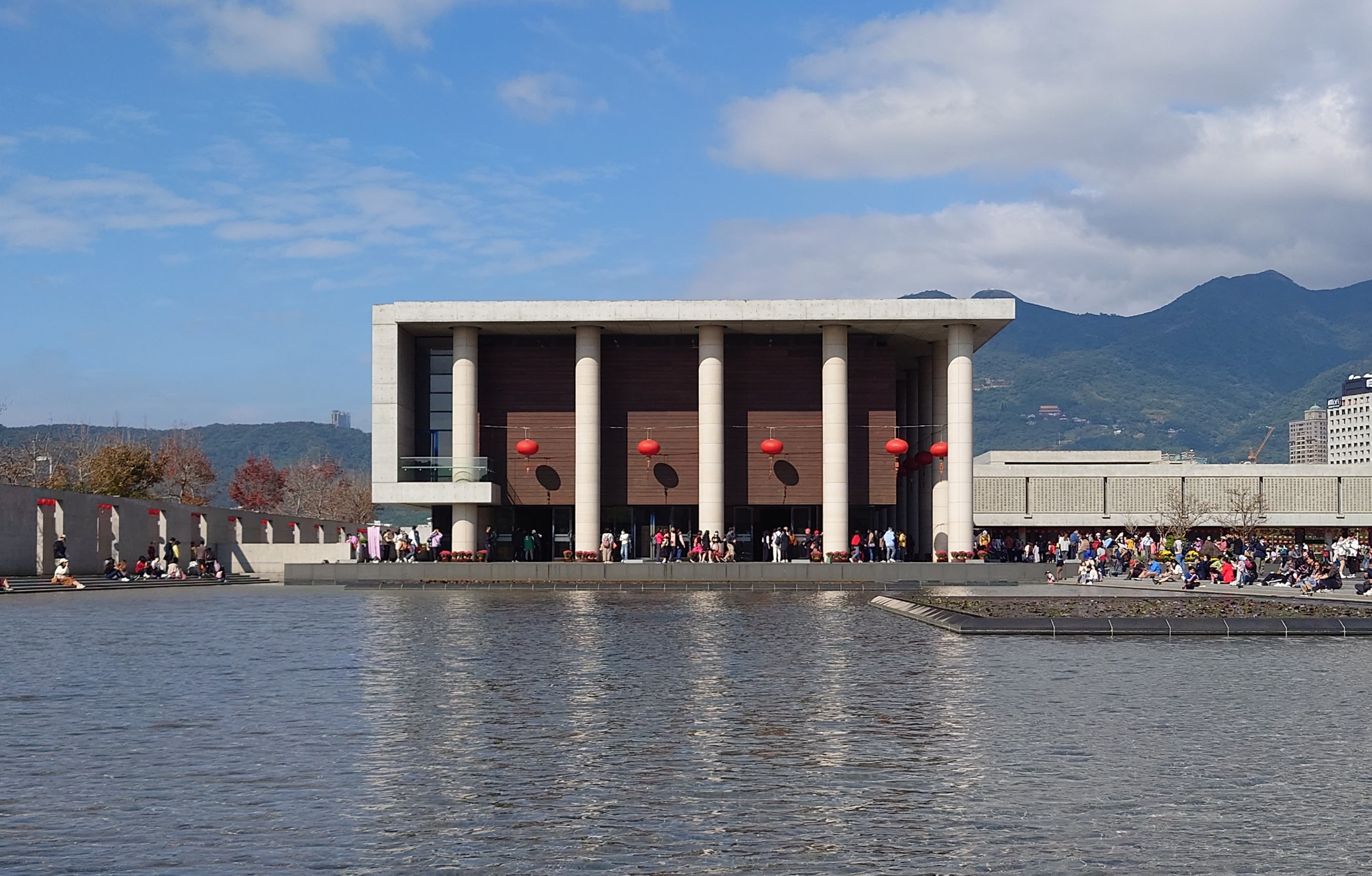
- Interactive map of Nung Chan Monastery

Architecture
- Groundbreaking: 1971
- Completed date: 1975

Site
- Location: Beitou, Taipei, Taiwan

The Nung Chan Monastery (Chinese: 農禪寺; pinyin: Nóngchánsì meaning 'Farming Ch'an') is a monastery at Beitou District, Taipei, Taiwan. It was formally founded in 1975 by Dongchu, a scholar monk and disciple of renowned Chinese Buddhist master Taixu. It's named ' Farming Ch'an ' as its early residents dedicated themselves to Ch'an practice and grew their own food. Its spirit is based on 8th century Zen Master Baizhang Huaihai's aphorism, "A day without work is a day without food."

Ven. Dongchu bought the 2.5 acres (10,000 m^{2}) land at Guandu Plain near Taipei in the end of the 1960s. As he didn't have many followers, he worked most of the land by himself and for the first few years, his only improvement is to have the land leveled. It then became a farmland worked by Ven. Dong Chu, his two disciples, and the neighboring villagers. In 1971, Ven. Dongchu finally began to build a two-story farmhouse that still existed today behind the main hall. The building was completed four years later in 1975. The land it was situated on was not zoned for religious purposes, but the building was classified as a shed as the building could separate the altar from other areas using a partition. The local authorities allowed this arrangement as the district was only marginally populated at the time.

Ven. Dongchu was determined to promote Buddhist culture in Taiwan and cultivating Buddhist human talent. The monastery became a center for Ven. Dongchu's cultural and educational activity, and annual winter charity events.

In 1978, Ven. Dongchu died and in his will he wanted to be succeeded by his disciple, Ven. Sheng-yen, as the abbot of the monastery. Ven. Sheng-yen was in United States by the time, he was just being elected abbot of a small monastery in Bronx, New York called Temple of Great Enlightenment. But he couldn't refuse his master's will and decided to return to Taiwan.

Under Ven. Sheng-yen's leadership the monastery's devotees increased, and it had to expand its buildings further. The two-story 3,600 square feet (330 m^{2}) farmhouse wasn't enough for the growing followers. Under the help of some donors, it then erected several temporary steel buildings. Some of Ven. Sheng-yen's earliest Taiwanese disciples were devotees and monks in Nung Chan.

Throughout the 1980s it continued to expand with temporary buildings as Master Sheng-yen's reputation grew, which led to less tolerance from the authorities on the zoning issues. Its capacity became quite overwhelmed by the late 1980s and finally the organization decided to buy a declining temple and new plot of land in the mountainous area of Jinshan, Taipei in 1989 and build a new center known as the Dharma Drum Mountain (DDM), which would become the name for all of Sheng-yen's institutions. Until today, after the completion of DDM in Jinshan, Nung Chan continues to serve as DDM's principal branch.

The original complex was nearly razed in 2004 before the Taipei government designated an original farmhouse as a heritage property. The monastery was reconstructed in 2012 by architect Kris Yao. It is also known as the Water-Moon Monastery (水月道場).

== Gallery ==
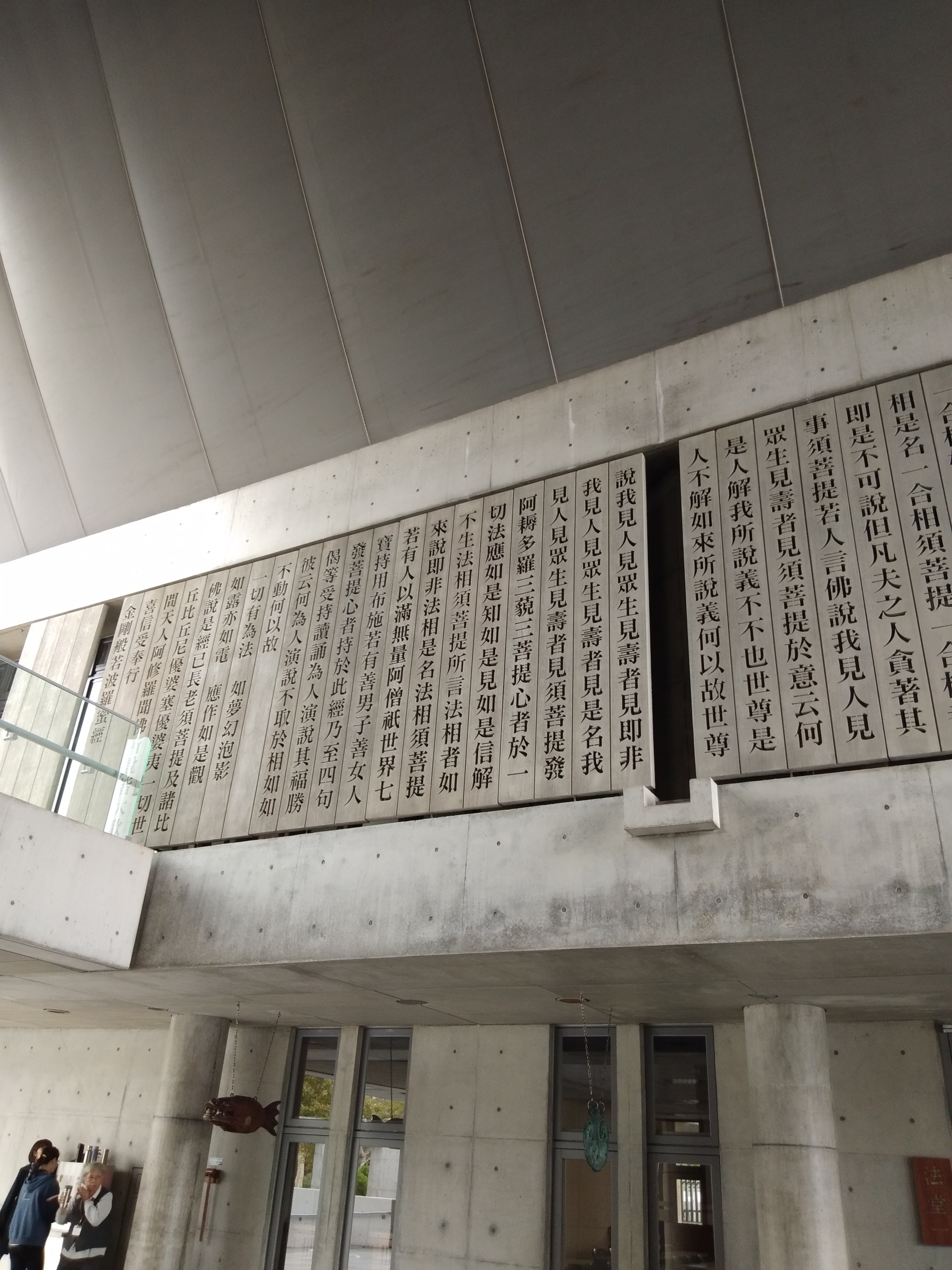

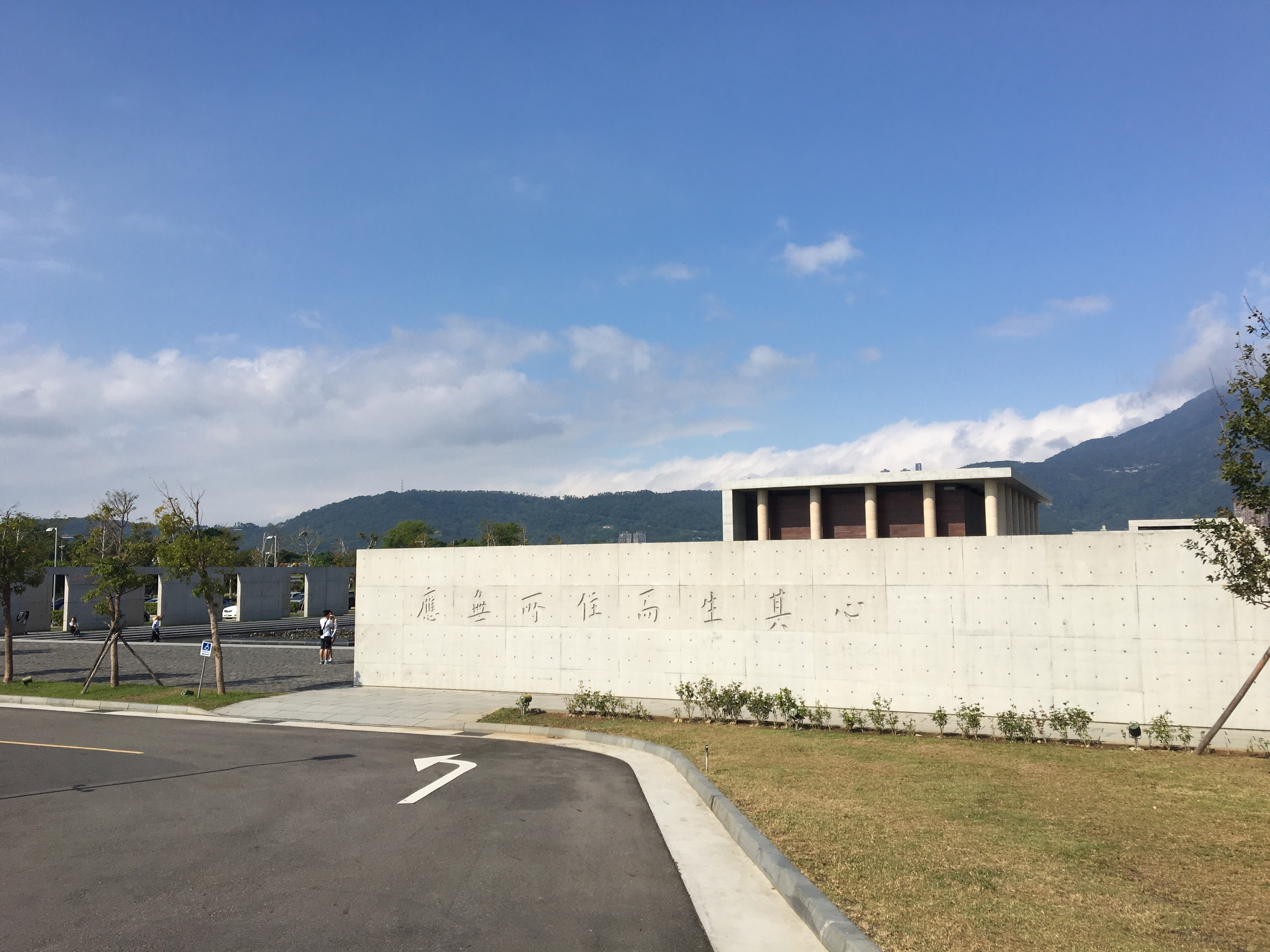

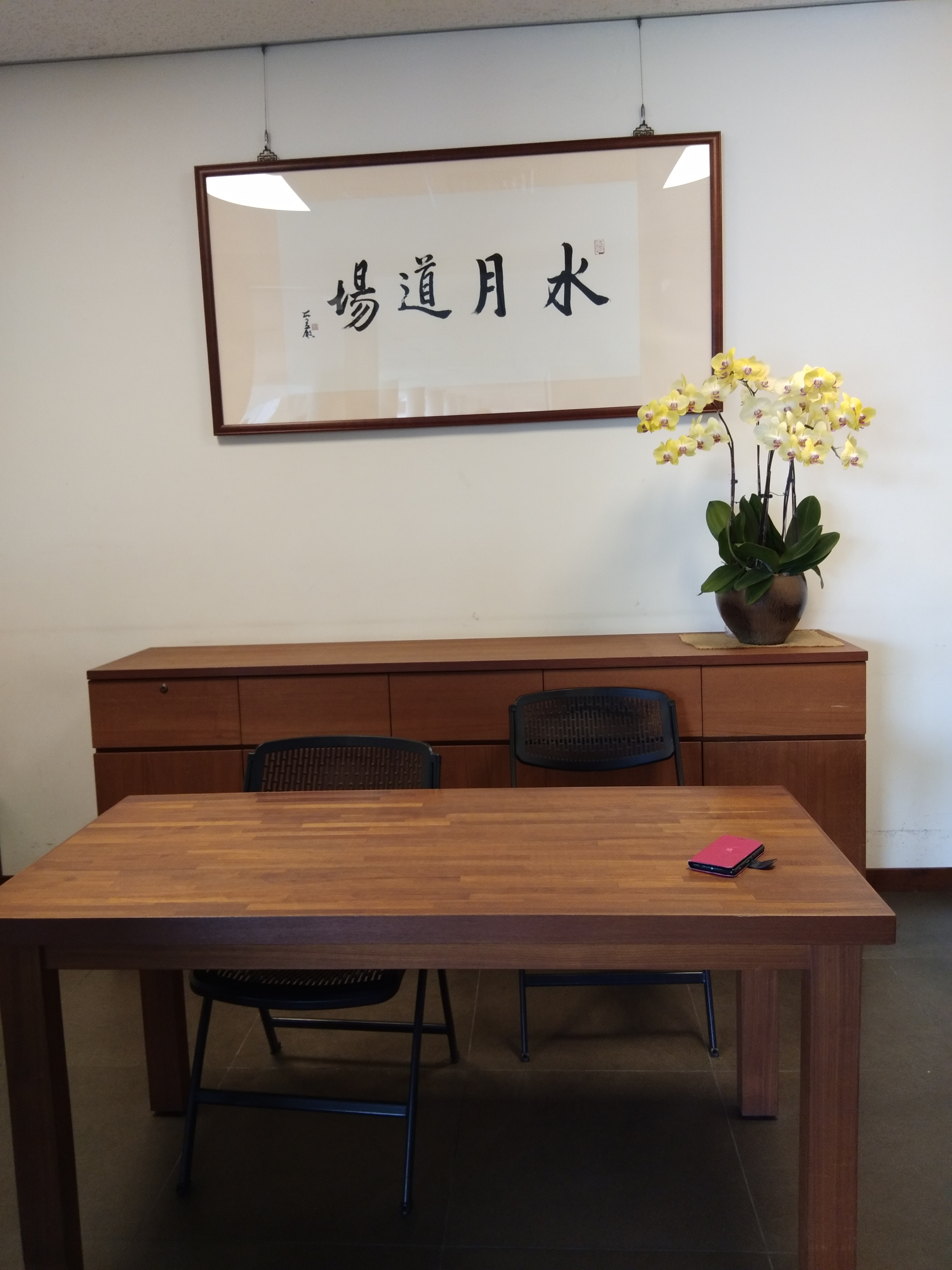

== See also ==
- Buddhism in Taiwan
- Ven. Dongchu
- Ven. Sheng-yen
- Dharma Drum Mountain
- Shandao Temple, Zhongzheng District
- Linji Huguo Chan Temple, Zhongshan District
- List of temples in Taiwan
