= Dharma Drum Mountain =

Buddhist foundation founded by master Sheng-yen

Coordinates: 25.2403°N 121.6151°E

- 法鼓山
- Dharma Drum Mountain logo: three mountain peaks and a meditating monk; combined, the logo forms a hand.
- Interactive map of Dharma Drum Mountain

Monastery information
- Full name: Dharma Drum Mountain Fagushan
- Order: Chán
- Denomination: Mahāyāna
- Established: 1989

People
- Founder: Ven. Chan master Sheng-yen
- Abbot: Ven. Guo Huei (past: Ven. Guo Dong)

Site
- Location: Jinshan District, New Taipei City, Taiwan
- Website: www.dharmadrum.org

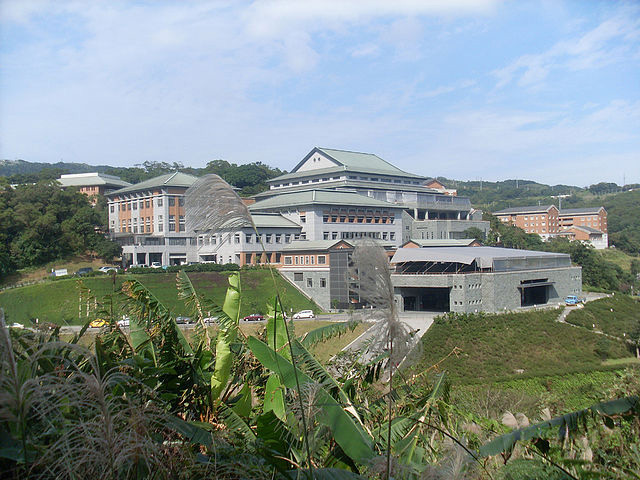
Dharma Drum Mountain headquarters in Taiwan

Dharma Drum Mountain (DDM; Chinese: 法鼓山; pinyin: Fǎgǔ Shān; Pe̍h-ōe-jī: Hoat-kó͘-soaⁿ) is an international Buddhist spiritual, cultural, and educational foundation founded by late Chan master Sheng-yen (1931–2009). The center focuses on educating the public in Buddhism with the goal of improving the world and establishing a "Pure Land on Earth" through Buddhist education. The international headquarters of this organization is located at Jinshan District, New Taipei City, Taiwan.

Dharma Drum Mountain is one of the most influential Buddhist organizations in Chinese Buddhism. In Taiwan, Master Sheng-yen was considered one of the "Four Heavenly Kings" and Dharma Drum Mountain one of the "Four Great Mountains" or four major Buddhist organizations of Taiwanese Buddhism, along with Tzu Chi, Fo Guang Shan, and Chung Tai Shan.

== History ==
Long before the establishment of the Jinshan headquarters, the development of Dharma Drum originated in the Chung-Hwa Institute of Buddhist Culture (CHIBC) and Nung Chan Monastery. Both were founded by Dongchu, a prominent Chan monk back in Mainland China and later in Taiwan, who was also disciple of renowned modernist monk, Grand Master Taixu.

CHIBC was founded in 1956 and primarily active in promoting Buddhist culture mainly through publishing journals, such as the periodical Humanity Magazine. Nung Chan ('Farming Chan') was established in 1975. Dongchu died two years later, and at 1978, his principal disciple and Dharma heir, Sheng-yen became the new abbot of both Nung Chan and CHIBC. Under Sheng-yen's leadership, both institutions grew rapidly, the number of devotees in Nung Chan and students in CHIBC overwhelmed the building capacity. Therefore, in 1989, the institutions bought a plot of hilly land in Jinshan, New Taipei City in order to build a new monastery that would accommodate the increasing devotees and students. Sheng-yen named the new monastery Dharma Drum Mountain – creating the Dharma Drum Mountain organization.

The architectural design of the monastery took seven years; the construction process took further time. Sheng-yen, in the framework of his environmentalism campaign, insisted the monastery buildings to follow and adjust to the natural contour of the hills – therefore it didn't change much of its natural geomorphologic features. He personally oversaw the whole process and carefully looked after the details. The first phase of DDM broke ground in 1993. The first phase of the project, which consists most of the complex of DDM we see today, was completed and inaugurated at 2001. In 2006, Master Sheng-yen's student Venerable Guo Dong succeeded him as abbot.

The organization's main focus is on teaching Buddhism to the public with the goal of improving the world for the benefit of all. Dharma Drum Mountain does do charity projects but mostly does so indirectly through the funding of other charities. As of 2005, the organization was estimated to have about 400,000 members.

== At Jinshan, New Taipei City ==
Dharma Drum Mountain at Jinshan is a complex of monasteries and education centers. Aside from being the international headquarters of Dharma Drum Mountain, it also serves as the campus of Dharma Drum Sangha University (DDSU), Dharma Drum Buddhist College (DDBC) and Dharma Drum University (DDU).

DDSU is specified for monastic training for monks both from Taiwan and various other countries. It had three fields of study: Basic Training, Buddhist Study, and Chan Study. DDBC is for both monastic and lay men. It opens graduate and post-graduate program for Buddhist Study and Buddhist informatics. DDU is currently under development. DDU, however, had opened registration for its first students with its preliminary office located at Beitou, Taipei City, just 15 minutes drive from Nung Chan.

The complex of Dharma Drum Mountain at Jinshan consists of several buildings (DDM Map Guide) (from the entrance):

- Building II
  - 1st level: Bus terminal
  - 2nd level: Visitor Service Center, Briefing room–theater, Dharma Shop–book store
  - 3rd level: The Guanyin Hall (with a tranquility pond in the front and waterfall in the background)
  - 4th level: Dining hall (vegetarian)
- Building I (note: as DDM buildings mirror the natural contour of the land, the ground floor of Building I is actually the 3rd level)
  - 3rd level: Founding History Memorial Hall
  - 4th level: Auxiliary Hall (artworks display)
  - 5th level: Multipurpose Exhibition Room
  - 6th level: Grand Buddha Hall
- Chan Hall
- Dharma Drum Buddhist College
- Library and Audio-Visual rooms
- Dharma Drum Sangha University
- Dharma Drum University (under construction)
- Monks quarter
- Nuns quarter

DDM Complex also has several distinguished features, such as:

- DDM Emblem Rock
- A stone inscription, "A Spiritual Mountain and Sublime Environment"
- Statue of welcoming Guanyin
- World's largest Lotus bell
- Statue of founding Guanyin
- Statue of the Medicine Buddha
- Seven walking paths with various attractions, from the splashing streams that pass through the land, a bamboo forest, and dense woodland with varieties of birds and insects

== Vision, spirit, and ideas ==
=== Vision and spirit ===
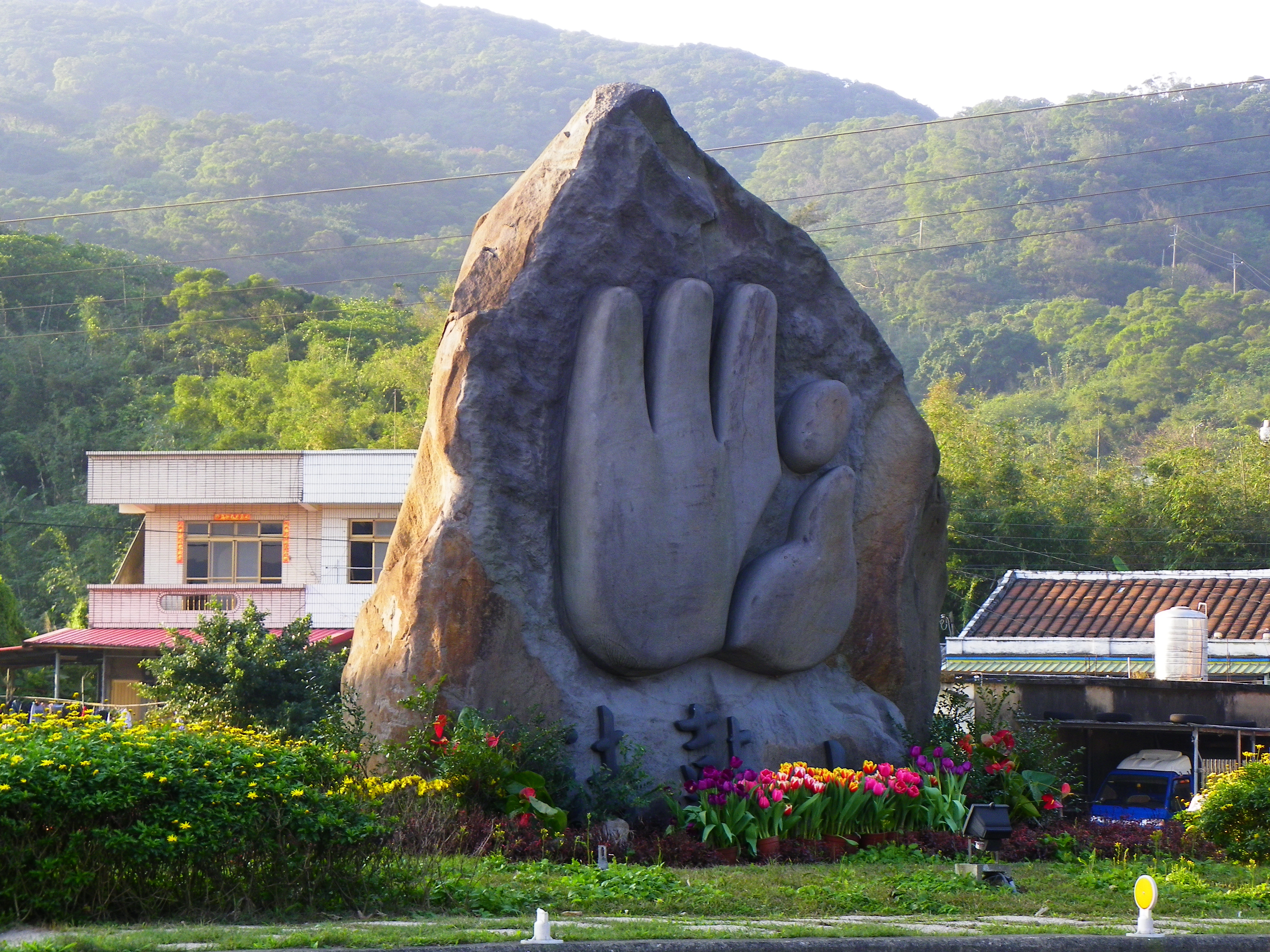
Road sign indicating entrance to Dharma Drum Mountain

Dharma Drum's vision is to "uplift the character of humanity and build a pure land on earth." Its spirit is to "give of ourselves for the benefit of all.

=== Three types of education ===
Dharma Drum's educational approach is summarized in three types of education:

- Education through Academics – to cultivate high-caliber Buddhist talent in the fields of research, teaching, Dharma propagation, or service through formal academic training.
- Education through Public Outreach – to promote or deepen the teachings of the Buddha through traditional Buddhist practices such as meditation or recitation of the Buddha's name as well as modern cultural activities.
- Education through Caring Services – to uplift the level of caring service through education, and realizing the educational goals through caring service. In the past, DDM had provided emergency assistance for natural disasters both in Taiwan and other countries, notably the 2004 Indian Ocean earthquake and the 2006 Yogyakarta earthquake.

=== Four kinds of environmentalism ===
Dharma Drum promotes the four kinds of environmentalism - these are manifestation of ideas and concepts in Buddhism to the frame of modern environmentalism. Portrayed as an offer of guidance for living in the 21st century

- Protecting the spiritual environment:
  - Ch'an meditation
  - The Fivefold Spiritual Renaissance Campaign
- Protecting the natural environment:
  - Recognizing blessings
  - Cherishing blessings
  - Nurturing blessings
  - Sowing the seeds of blessings
- Protecting the living environment.
- Protecting the social environment:
  - The Six Ethics of the Mind
  - Buddhist-Style Joint Weddings
  - Buddhist-Style Joint Birthday Celebration for the Elderly
  - Buddhist-Style Joint Natural Funerals

=== Fivefold spiritual renaissance campaign ===
- Four Fields for Cultivating Peace — A Proposition for Uplifting the Character of Humanity:
  - Cultivating a peaceful mind lies in reducing desires
  - Cultivating a peaceful body lies in hard work and thrift
  - Cultivating a peaceful family lies in love and respect
  - Cultivating peaceful activity lies in being honest and upright
- Four Steps for Handling a Problem- A Proposition for Resolving the Difficulties of Life:
  - Face it: face the difficulty squarely
  - Accept it: accept the reality of the difficulty
  - Deal with it: deal with the difficulty with wisdom and compassion
  - Let it go: afterwards, let go of it
- Four Practices for Helping Oneself and Others — A Proposition for Getting Along with Others:
  - Feeling grateful for the chance to develop
  - Feeling thankful for the opportunity to hone your practice
  - Reforming yourself through the Dharma
  - Influencing others through virtuous action
- Four Ways to Cultivate Blessings — A Proposition for Increasing Blessings:
  - Recognizing blessings is the greatest happiness
  - Cherishing blessings is the best way of saving
  - Nurture blessings, and you'll always be blessed
  - Sow the seeds of blessings that blessings may be shared by all

=== Six ethics of mind ===
- Family Ethics
- Living Ethics
- School Ethics
- Environmental Ethics
- Workplace Ethics
- Ethics between Ethnic Groups

== Global affiliates ==
Dharma Drum Mountain has affiliated centers and temples in fourteen countries spread across North America, Europe, Asia, and Oceania.

== See also ==
- Buddhism in Taiwan
- Four Great Mountains (Taiwan)
- Four Heavenly Kings (Taiwan)
- Guo Yuan
- Guo Xing
- Nung Chan Monastery
