= Dongchu =

Dongchu 東初
- Dongchu standing near the front door of the Chung-hwa Institute of Buddhist Culture
- Title: Venerable

Personal life
- Born: (surname) Fan 范 September 22, 1908 Jiangsu, China
- Died: December 15, 1977 (aged 69) Republic of China

Religious life
- Religion: Buddhism

Dongchu (Chinese: 東初; pinyin: Dōngchū, 1907–1977) was a Chinese Chan Buddhist master in mainland China and later in Taiwan, and also the teacher of respected modern-day Chan master Sheng-yen. He is the 51st generation of Chan/Zen patriarch from the Caodong school (See lineage chart). He also established several monasteries and organizations in Taiwan that continue to exist and expand to this very day, including Chung-hwa Institute of Buddhist Culture and Nung Chan Monastery.

He was born in Jiangsu province, China. At his early education period, he studied with various prominent monks such as Master Aiting and Master Nanting from the Zhulin Buddhist Institute in Zhenjiang. He then pursued his study further at Minnan Buddhist Institute in Xiamen, and studied under renowned scholar-monk and modernist Master Taixu. His peers in the institute include Master Yinshun, Zhumo, and Cihang (Tzuhang) – all of whom also became influential monks.

After graduating from Minnan Buddhist Institute, Ven. Dongchu then became dean of the prestigious school Jiaoshan Buddhist Institute. At the same time, he was abbot of the Dinghui Monastery in Zhenjiang, Jiangsu province. Dinghui Monastery (Monastery of Samadhi and Wisdom) was a very famous Chan monastery in China, it stands on an island in the Yangtze River, on a hill called Floating Jade Mountain. It was first built around 194-195 CE and changed names several times before finally became Dinghui Monastery during Qing dynasty. He also taught classes at several other Buddhist institutes, including Jingan Si (Quiet Calm) Academy in Shanghai – at which young Sheng-yen, who was studying there, first encountered him. Ven. Dongchu had a reputation as a progressive thinker who, unlike most monks at his time, would not hesitate to criticize others. He was also known as a fierce teacher and his students gave him the nickname the 'Big Gun'. His paradigm was much influence by his teacher, Taixu.

He also became the first permanent council member in the Buddhist Association of the Republic of China in 1947. But it did not last long as within the next couple of years, the Communist Party drove Nationalists out of the mainland China, and many religious leaders, in fear of the Communists' persecution, fled overseas – including Ven. Dongchu, who fled to Taiwan at 1949.

He took temporary shelter at Beitou, near Taipei, at the Fazang Monastery. Three months later, his passion for Buddhist education and culture led him to start the Humanity Magazine – the first Buddhist periodical in Taiwan. Its mission is to "purify the minds of the people and establish Life Buddhism." By the early 1950s, it had grown very popular and its circulation reached Southeast Asia and East Asia, and the United States.

Ven. Dongchu established his first monastery in Taiwan at 1955. It was located in Beitou, near Taipei, and was completed a year later. Instead of naming it a 'monastery', he named it Chung-Hwa Institute of Buddhist Culture to establish a foundation for cultural work. In 1956, he started a charity program called 'Winter Relief Drive' to collect donations to buy rice, oil, and winter clothing for poor families and orphanages in Beitou, Tamsui, Sanchong, Yilan, Taoyuan, and Xinzhuang. Therefore, they could celebrate Chinese New Year with warmth and meal.

Ven. Sheng-yen, who had been an active writer in the Humanity Magazine under his pen-name Xing Shi Jiang Jun ("World Awakening General"), became Ven. Dongchu's disciple in 1959. Ven. Sheng-yen was a soldier in the intelligence unit at that time, he joined the Army unwillingly in order to escape from mainland China. Despite his position in the intelligence, Ven. Sheng-yen's request to be dismissed from his post was accepted by his superior with Ven. Dongchu's help.

Aside from his intellectual and charity activities, Ven. Dongchu didn't spend much time leading Buddhist ceremonies or rituals. In his later years, he rarely went out to focus on his writings. Thus, he didn't have many followers and disciples. However, he was persistent and in the 1960s he bought a 2.5 acres of land in the Guandu Plain, near Taipei.

Ven. Dongchu with his disciple Ven. Sheng-yen in the United States

In the beginning it only serves as a farmland cultivated by Ven. Dongchu and his two disciples – Ven. Sheng-yen was in solitary retreat at southern Taiwan by the time. Step by step, he built a farmhouse, and after four years of works, he succeeded to establish another monastery, Nung Chan Monastery in 1975. In Nung Chan, meaning Farming Chan, the residents practice Chan while grow their own food. They live by the famous aphorism by Zen Master Baizhang Huaihai, "A day without work is a day without food". The monastery was dedicated to Bodhisattva Wenshu (Mañjuśrī), which symbolizes great wisdom.

In 1976, Ven. Dongchu had a chance to visit his disciple Ven. Sheng-yen in New York. Ven. Sheng-yen was an abbot of a small monastery at the Bronx and he succeeded to gain a number of Western followers. They both had parted long before. Ven. Sheng-yen went to six-years solitary retreat in 1961. He then studied in Japan for some years and earned a doctorate degree before arriving in United States.

Ven. Dongchu died in 1977 in sitting position with no clear illness. In his last will he passed down the abbotship of Chung-hwa Institute of Buddhist Culture and Nung Chan to Ven. Sheng-yen. His ashes, which were kept in Chung-hwa Institute of Buddhist Culture before, were buried in the Life Memorial Garden of Dharma Drum Mountain in 2007.

The Chinese name of New York City's Chaan Meditation Center (東初禪寺) is named after Ven. Master Dongchu by his disciple Ven. Master Sheng-yen.
