= Sheng-yen =

Chinese Chan Buddhist monk and writer

Sheng Yen
- 聖嚴
- Title: Chan master

Personal life
- Born: January 22, 1931 Nantong, Jiangsu, Republic of China
- Died: February 3, 2009 (aged 78) Taipei, Taiwan
- Education: Rissho University (MA, PhD)
- Other name: Changjin (novice name)
- Occupation: Buddhist monk, religious scholar, writer

Religious life
- Religion: Chan Buddhism
- School: Caodong, Linji

Senior posting
- Teacher: Dongchu, Ling Yuan, Ban Tetsugyu Soin

Sheng Yen (Chinese: 聖嚴; pinyin: Shèngyán; Pe̍h-ōe-jī: Sèng-giâm), born Zhang Baokang (Chinese: 張保康; pinyin: Zhāngbǎokāng; Pe̍h-ōe-jī: Tiuⁿ Pó-khong), (January 22, 1931 – February 3, 2009) was a Taiwanese Buddhist monk, religious scholar, and writer. He was one of the mainstream teachers of Chan Buddhism. He was a 57th generational dharma heir of Linji Yixuan in the Linji school (Japanese: Rinzai) and a third-generation dharma heir of Hsu Yun. In the Caodong (Japanese: Sōtō) lineage, Sheng Yen was a 52nd-generation Dharma heir of Dongshan Liangjie (807-869), and a direct Dharma heir of Dongchu (1908–1977).

Sheng Yen was the founder of the Dharma Drum Mountain, a Buddhist organization based in Taiwan. During his time in Taiwan, Sheng Yen was well known as a progressive Buddhist teacher who sought to teach Buddhism in a modern and Western-influenced world. In Taiwan, he was one of four prominent modern Buddhist masters, along with Hsing Yun, Cheng Yen and Wei Chueh, popularly referred to as the "Four Heavenly Kings" of Taiwanese Buddhism. In 2000 he was one of the keynote speakers in the Millennium World Peace Summit of Religious and Spiritual Leaders held in the United Nations.

== Biography ==
=== Early life (1931–1959) ===
Born as Chang Baokang on January 22, 1931, in Nantong, Jiangsu near Shanghai in mainland China, he became a monk at the age of 13. During the Chinese Civil War, he went to Taiwan in 1949 by enlisting in a unit of the Nationalist Army. After leaving the army Sheng Yen became recognized as a Dharma Heir in both the Linji and Caodong traditions and became a monk again in 1959.

=== Resuming monastic life ===
From 1961 to 1968 he trained in solitary retreat in southern Taiwan at Chao Yuan Monastery. Sheng Yen became a lecturer at Shan Dao Monastery in Taipei and then completed a master's degree (1971) and doctorate (1975) in Buddhist literature at Rissho University in Japan. At the time Sheng Yen was the only major Buddhist figure in Taiwan to have earned a doctorate from a reputable foreign university.

Sheng Yen received full transmission in the Caodong tradition in 1975 and the Linji tradition in 1978.

Sheng Yen became abbot of Nung Chan in Taiwan in 1978 and founder of the Institute of Chung-Hwa Buddhist Culture in New York City in 1979. In 1985, he founded the Institute of Chung-Hwa Buddhist Studies in Taipei and the International Cultural and Educational Foundation of Dharma Drum Mountain in 1989.

=== Propagation of Buddhadharma in the West ===
Sheng Yen taught in the United States starting in 1975, and established Chan Meditation Center in Queens, New York, and its retreat center, Dharma Drum Retreat Center at Pine Bush, New York in 1997. He also visited many countries in Europe, as well as continuing his teaching in several Asian countries, in particular Taiwan. Sheng Yen gave dharma transmission to several of his lay Western students, such as John Crook, who later formed the Western Chan Fellowship, and several other Western disciples such as Simon Child, Max Kalin, and Zarko Andricevic.

Sheng Yen's health was poor in the last couple years of his life, although he still gave lectures in Taiwan.

=== Death ===
Sheng Yen died from renal failure on February 3, 2009, while returning from National Taiwan University Hospital in Taipei. He had endured the illness for many years, but refused a kidney transplant. In accordance with East Asian age reckoning, the Dharma Drum Mountain organization states that Sheng Yen died at the age of 80. Officially, according to the Western way of reckoning age, Sheng Yen died at the age of 78.

Hours after his death, tributes from eminent Buddhist monks and Taiwanese politicians and celebrities, including President Ma Ying-jeou, Vice President Vincent Siew, DPP Chairwoman Tsai Ing-wen, kung fu star Jet Li, and actress Brigitte Lin, began to pour into Dharma Drum Mountain monastery. As stipulated in his will, Sheng Yen forbade the use of extravagant funeral services, including the construction of memorials or monuments. Sheng Yen received a simple Buddhist ritual attended by the President and dignitaries, and was buried in the Life Memorial Garden near the monastery. His ashes were divided into five sections, with each section filled by the Abbot, senior disciples, President Ma, Vice President Siew, and other laity.

== Dharma heirs ==
Monks:

- Chi Chern
- Guo Ru (Founder and Abbot of Chan Grove, Taipei, first monastic disciple of Ven. Sheng Yen)
- Guo Yuan
- Guo Dong(Abbot of Dharma Drum Mountain 2006-2018)
- Hui Min (President of Dharma Drum University 2007-2014, scholar monk)
- Guo Xing (Vice Abbot Dharma Drum Mountain, Former Abbot of Chan Meditation Center Elmhurst New York)
- Guo Jun

Western Lay practitioners:

- John Crook

In the Chan lineage of Sheng Yen, a "Dharma heir" receives the dharma transmission based on his or her selfless administrative contributions to Dharma Drum Mountain and practice of Chan. However, a Dharma heir may not have had a personal experience of self-nature or Buddha-nature, the nature of śūnyatā, in which case the person would also receive yinke (Jp. inka shōmei), the seal of approval. Among the Dharma heirs, there are only a few who have both Dharma transmission and yinke.

Among Sheng Yen's senior disciples, there are also those who have received yinke but no dharma transmission for various reasons.

== Books ==
In alphabetical order of the books' title:

- Sheng Yen, A Journey of Learning and Insight, Dharma Drum Publishing Corp, 2012. ISBN 978-957-598-580-6
- Sheng Yen, Attaining the Way: A Guide to the Practice of Chan Buddhism. Shambhala Publications, 2006. ISBN 978-1-59030-372-6.
- Sheng Yen, Complete Enlightenment - Zen Comments on the Sutra of Complete Enlightenment. Shambhala Publications, 1998. ISBN 978-1-57062-400-1.
- Sheng Yen, Dharma Drum: The Life & Heart of Ch'an Practice. Shambhala Publications, 2006. ISBN 978-1-59030-396-2.
- Sheng Yen, Faith in Mind: A Guide to Chan Practice. Dharma Publishing, 1987. ISBN 978-0-9609854-2-5.
- Sheng Yen, Getting the Buddha Mind: On the Practice of Chan Retreat. North Atlantic Books, 2005. ISBN 978-1-55643-526-3.
- Sheng Yen and Dan Stevenson, Hoofprint of the Ox: Principles of the Chan Buddhist Path As Taught by a Modern Chinese Master. Oxford University Press, 2002. ISBN 0-19-515248-4.
- Sheng Yen (ed. John Crook), Illuminating Silence: The Practice of Chinese Zen. Watkins, 2002. ISBN 1-84293-031-1.
- Sheng Yen, Orthodox Chinese Buddhism. Dharma Drum, 2007. ISBN 1-55643-657-2. Online text
- Sheng Yen, Ox-herding at Morgan's Bay. Dharma Drum, 1988. ISBN 0-9609854-3-3.
- Sheng Yen, Setting in Motion the Dharma Wheel. Dharma Drum Publications, 2000. ASIN B001HPIU4K.
- Sheng Yen, Shattering the Great Doubt: The Chan Practice of Huatou. Shambhala, 2009. ISBN 978-1-59030-621-5.
- Sheng Yen, Song of Mind: Wisdom from the Zen Classic Xin Ming. Shambhala, 2004. ISBN 1-59030-140-4.
- Sheng Yen, Subtle Wisdom: Understanding Suffering, Cultivating Compassion Through Ch'an Buddhism. Image, 1999. ISBN 978-0-385-48045-1.
- Sheng Yen, The Infinite Mirror: Commentaries on Two Chan Classics. Shambala, 2006. ISBN 978-1-59030-398-6.
- Sheng Yen, The Method of No-Method: The Chan Practice of Silent Illumination. Shambhala, 2008. ISBN 1-59030-575-2.
- Sheng Yen, The Poetry of Enlightenment: Poems by Ancient Chan Masters. Shambala, 2006. ISBN 978-1-59030-399-3.
- Sheng Yen, The Six Paramitas: Perfections of the Bodhisattva path, a commentary. Dharma Drum, 2002. ASIN: B0006S8EYU.
- Sheng Yen, The Sword of Wisdom: A Commentary on the Song of Enlightenment. North Atlantic Books, 2002. ISBN 978-1-55643-428-0.
- Sheng Yen, There Is No Suffering: A Commentary on the Heart Sutra. Dharma Drum, 2002. ISBN 1-55643-385-9.
- Sheng Yen, Things Pertaining to Bodhi: The Thirty-seven Aids to Enlightenment. Shambhala, 2010. ISBN 978-1-59030-790-8.
- Sheng Yen, Zen Wisdom. North Atlantic Books, 2002. ISBN 978-1-55643-386-3.

Autobiography of Master Sheng Yen:

- Sheng Yen, Footprints in the Snow: The Autobiography of a Chinese Buddhist Monk. Doubleday Religion, 2008. ISBN 978-0-385-51330-2.

History of the Dharma Drum Lineage:

- Yu, Jimmy (2022). Reimagining Chan Buddhism : Sheng Yen and the creation of the Dharma Drum lineage of Chan. Abingdon, Oxon. ISBN 978-1-003-19637-2. OCLC 1252738811.

== See also ==
- Dharma Drum Mountain
- Nung Chan Monastery
- Timeline of Zen Buddhism in the United States

== Bibliography ==
- Yu, Jimmy (2010). "A Tentative Exploration into the Development of Master Sheng Yen's Chan Teachings" (PDF). Chung-Hwa Buddhist Journal. 23. Taipei: Chung-Hwa Institute of Buddhist Studies: 3–38. ISSN 1017-7132. Archived from the original (PDF) on 2014-09-19.
