= Taixu =

Qing Dynasty Buddhist monk (1890–1947)

Taixu Shi Taixu
- 釋太虛
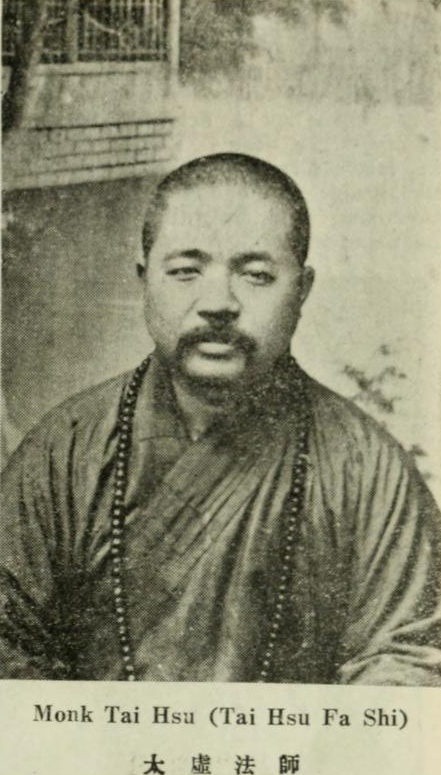
- Photo of Taixu from a book published in 1933

Personal life
- Born: Lǚ Pèilín or Lǚ Gànsēn; January 8, 1890 Haining County, Zhejiang, Qing China
- Died: March 17, 1947 (aged 57) Shanghai, China

Religious life
- Religion: Humanistic Buddhism
- School: Mahayana
- Dharma name: Weixin

Senior posting
- Students: Yinshun

Military service

Chinese name
- Traditional Chinese: 释太虚
- Simplified Chinese: 釋太虛
Transcriptions
Standard Mandarin
- Hanyu Pinyin: Shì Tàixū

Birth name
- Traditional Chinese: 呂淦森 or 呂沛林
- Simplified Chinese: 吕淦森 or 吕沛林
Transcriptions
Standard Mandarin
- Hanyu Pinyin: Lǚ Gànsēn or Lǚ Pèilín

Courtesy name
- Traditional Chinese: 太虚
- Simplified Chinese: 太虛
Transcriptions
Standard Mandarin
- Hanyu Pinyin: Tàixū

Dharma name
- Chinese: 唯心
Transcriptions
Standard Mandarin
- Hanyu Pinyin: Wéixīn

Art name
- Chinese: 昧庵
Transcriptions
Standard Mandarin
- Hanyu Pinyin: Mèi'ān

Taixu (Tai-hsu, traditional Chinese: 太虛; simplified Chinese: 太虚; pinyin: Tàixū; Wade–Giles: T'ai Hsü; January 8, 1890 – March 17, 1947), also called Shi Taixu, was a Buddhist modernist, activist and thinker who advocated for a reformation and revival of Chinese Buddhism by drawing upon eclectic domestic and foreign sources and ideologies.

== Biography ==
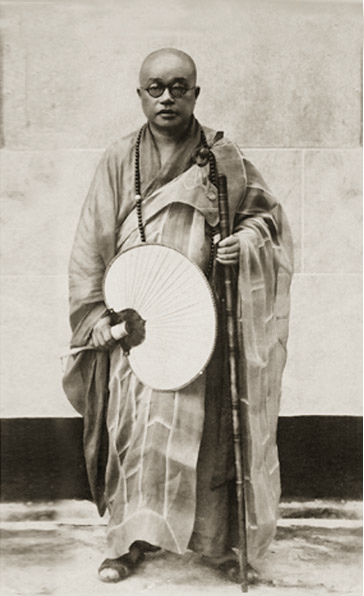
Taixu wearing his traditional kāṣāya robes.

Taixu was born in Haining in Zhejiang province. His lay name was Lǚ Pèilín (呂沛林). His parents died when he was still young, and he was raised by his grandparents. At 16, he was ordained into the Linji school of Chan Buddhism in Xiao Jiǔhuá Temple (小九華寺) in Suzhou. Not long after being ordained he was given the Dharma name of Taixu, meaning Great Emptiness. In 1909, he traveled to Nanking to join the Sutra Carving Society established there by the lay Buddhist Yang Renshan.

As a result of being exposed to the political writings of Kang Youwei, Liang Qichao, Tan Sitong and Zhang Taiyan, Taixu turned his mind to the reformation of Buddhism. In 1911 while in Guangzhou, he made contact with the revolutionaries plotting to overthrow the Qing dynasty and participated in some secret revolutionary activities. Taixu would later describe the formation of his political thinking during this time in his Autobiography (自傳 zìzhuàn):

My social and political thought was based upon 'Mr. Constitution', the Republican Revolution, Socialism, and Anarchism. As I read works such as Zhang Taiyan's "On Establishing Religion", "On the Five Negatives", and "On Evolution", I came to see Anarchism and Buddhism as close companions, and as a possible advancement from Democratic Socialism.

After the establishment of the new Republic of China, Taixu founded the Association for the Advancement of Buddhism (佛教協進會/佛教协进会 fójiào xiéjìn hùi), which lasted only a short time due to resistance from conservative Buddhists. Unable to convince the Buddhist community of his ideas, and shocked by the outbreak of the First World War and the sufferings in China, Taixu went into seclusion (閉關/闭关 bìguān) on Putuoshan for three years from October 1914.

Until his death Taixu worked toward the revival of Buddhism in China, although because of the economic and political turmoil that China experienced through wars and revolutions, few of his projects were successful. He died on March 12, 1947, at the Jade Buddha Temple (玉佛寺 yùfó sì) in Shanghai. Several of his influential disciples include Yin Shun 印順 (1906–2005) and Dongchu 東初 (1907–1977).

== Buddhist Modernism ==
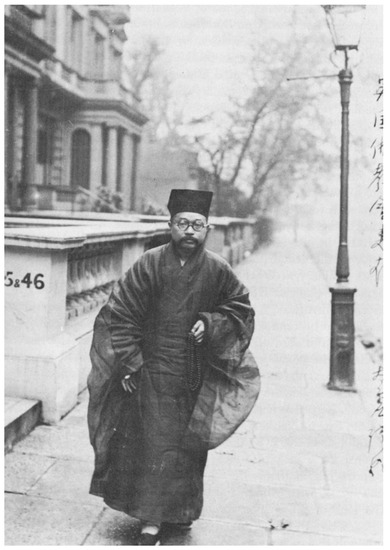
Taixu in London in 1929

Besides being a revolutionary activist for the Chinese, Taixu was a Buddhist modernist. He took the doctrine and adapted it so that he may propagate Buddhism throughout the world. One of his grand schemes was to reorganize the Sangha. His envisioned plan was to cut the number of monks in the monastic order down and according to history of religion professor Don A. Pittman, by 1930 Taixu had

these numbers [down] to include only twenty thousand monastics; five thousand students, twelve thousand bodhisattva monastics, and three thousand elders. Of the twelve thousand bodhisattva monastics, five thousand should be spreading the Dharma through public preaching and teaching, three thousand serving as administrators in Buddhist educational institutions, fifteen hundred engaging in Buddhist charitable and relief work, fifteen hundred serving as instructors in the monastic educational system, and one thousand participating in various cultural affairs.

This reorganization of the Sangha was an attempt to revitalize Buddhism, an important step to bring about a Pure Land in this world. Pure Land Buddhism was widely practiced in China during his time. Taixu's modernist mentality caused him to propagate the idea of a Pure Land, not as a land of Buddhist cosmology but as something possible to create here and now in this very world. Pittman writes:

His views on the realization of that ideal were far from those of the mainstream of the contemporary Sangha. Rather than focusing on the glories of distant pure lands, which were accessible through reliance on the spiritual merit and power of other great bodhisattvas and buddhas, Taixu visualized this earthly world transformed into a pure land by the dedication and sacrificial hard work of thousands of average bodhisattvas who were mindful of what their concerted witness could mean.

Like many Buddhist modernists, Taixu was interested in using tactics such as cultural translation (a method of explaining Buddhism) so that non-Buddhists can better comprehend the complexity of the tradition. For example, in his essay "Science and Buddhism," Taixu makes a translation of the Buddha's teaching that inside of every drop of water, there are 84 thousand microbes, a Buddhist teaching that basically states that within our world there are many more worlds. He goes on to explain how that when one looks inside of a microscope one will be able to see these tiny microbes and that each one is a life of its own.

In his writings he connected the scientific theory that there is infinite space with no center of the universe to the Buddhist Sutras that states "Space is endless and the number of worlds is infinite, for all are in mutual counterpoise like a network of innumerable beads." However, Taixu did not believe that science was the be-all and end-all. As a matter of fact, he saw that in no way was it possible to reach enlightenment through science even though it is capable of explaining many of the universe's mysteries. "Scientific knowledge can prove and postulate the Buddhist doctrine, but it cannot ascertain the realities of the Buddhist doctrine." He understood Buddhism to be scientific and yet surpassing science.

== Contacts with Christianity ==
Taixu's reforms of the Sangha were influenced in part by Christianity. While in Europe, Taixu saw the successes of Christian charitable organizations and hoped to bring that organization style into his reformed Buddhism. He implemented these methods into organizations like the Bodhi Society and Right Faith Society, lay organizations devoted to providing charity to the sick, poor, and misfortunate.

However, he was critical of Christian philosophy, believing that it was incompatible with modern science and failed to prevent economic depressions in Europe and both World Wars. Western critics argued that he was naive and ill-informed about Christian philosophy, calling his Lectures in Buddhism "a rambling, incoherent, amateurish talk."

== Survey of Writings ==
In one publication by Taixu, he discusses the importance of interreligious dialogue. He realizes the problems that exist in China and through a conversation with a Catholic archbishop he was able to understand this importance. Taixu writes:

All religions should be regulated in order that they conform to the situation in China. There should be no overt rejection of Catholicism.

This quote shows that Taixu believed there was no reason to deny the teachings of another religion because different religions, with cooperation and open-mindedness, have the ability to work together and learn from each other. Taixu went as far as incorporating some Christian ideas, such as methods of pastoral training and revival style preaching, into his own Buddhist practices.

Beyond adopting select Christian's methods, a more controversial topic that Taixu dealt with openly was the existence of God. When Taixu went into three years of self-confinement after a failed reform attempt, he reflected on the subject -

Who is God? Is He made of matter or not? . . . If He exists in the heart only, then his existence is legendary, similar to such non-existent things as "turtle hair" and "hare horn." Thus, we should not believe that God created all things in the world. . . . How did He create the Universe? If the Holy Father is part of the universe, it is unreasonable that He created the world. I challenge the existence of God. Show me the evidence of the birth of God. What was He before His birth? Does He exist because He possesses an inherent nature? It is not rational to claim that all things exist before His birth. If there is a birth, or a beginning, there should be an end. It is unreasonable to say that He is almighty. . . . If, with knowledge, God created man and all things at His will, then did He create man blindly or ignorantly? How could He create sinful things, crimes, ignorance, and even blasphemers? This would be unreasonable. If He did all these things, it would be unreasonable that God sent people into exile, to make them suffer, rather than allowing them to stay in Paradise. How could God create men who do not respect Him?

Taixu questions the existence of God because rationally if one looks at the world's situation there is no evidence of a god. He appears to tie this argument to the connections between Buddhism and science, and how superstition creates an obstacle on the path to enlightenment.

In Taixu's own article "Science and Buddhism" he offers many interesting and original thoughts on science and superstition. Taixu's main argument in the article is that all of the superstition in the world such as "The superstition of God or the restriction of the ego" and "the superstition of reality" prevent the advance of scientific discovery because of the closed-mindedness of the superstitious people to see beyond their beliefs. Taixu writes,

Science therefore, can never be the main support of Buddhism although it may act as a valuable auxiliary and much may be expected from uniting the two methods of investigation.

From his writings, Taixu's followers can grasp an understanding that he believes science is a valuable resource but because of people's steadfast faith in superstitions it will never be a successful asset to Buddhism. He seems to argue that science is a means to enlightenment, but it will never allow someone to get there. In Taixu's words, "Scientific methods can only corroborate the Buddhist doctrine, they can never advance beyond it."

Don Pittman wrote a book entitled "Toward a Modern Chinese Buddhism" in which he analyzes Taixu's reform efforts. One of his reform efforts was the attempt to make Pure Land Buddhism a reality.

If today, based on good knowledge of our minds, we can produce pure thoughts and work hard to accomplish good deeds. How hard can it be to transform an impure China into a Chinese pure land?... All persons have this force of mind, and since they already have the faculty (benneng) to create a pure land, they can all make the glorious vow to make this world into a pure land and work hard to achieve it."

This among many things was one of Taixu's greatest ideas of reform. He believed that the only way to end the suffering on this world was to bring the Pure Land to it. He attempted to do so through many means, including the reorganization of the Sangha. Unfortunately for Taixu, his attempts at global propagation of the Dharma failed. Most of his institutions that were set up to help bring about this better life were crushed by many different things, including the communists.

== See also ==
- Chiang Kai-shek

== Sources ==
- Taixu, "Science and Buddhism." Lectures in Buddhism. Paris, 1928
- Taixu, Taixu dashi quanshu. (The Complete Works of the Venerable Master Taixu), 20 vols. Taipei, 1956.
- Pittman, Don A. Toward a Modern Chinese Buddhism: Taixu's Reforms. Hawai'i UP. Honolulu, 2001.
- Ritzinger, Justin R. Anarchy in the Pure Land: Reinventing the Cult of Maitreya in Modern Chinese Buddhism. Oxford UP, Oxford, 2017.
- Welch, Homles. The Buddhist Revival in China. Harvard UP. Cambridge, 1968.
