= Buddhism in the Philippines =

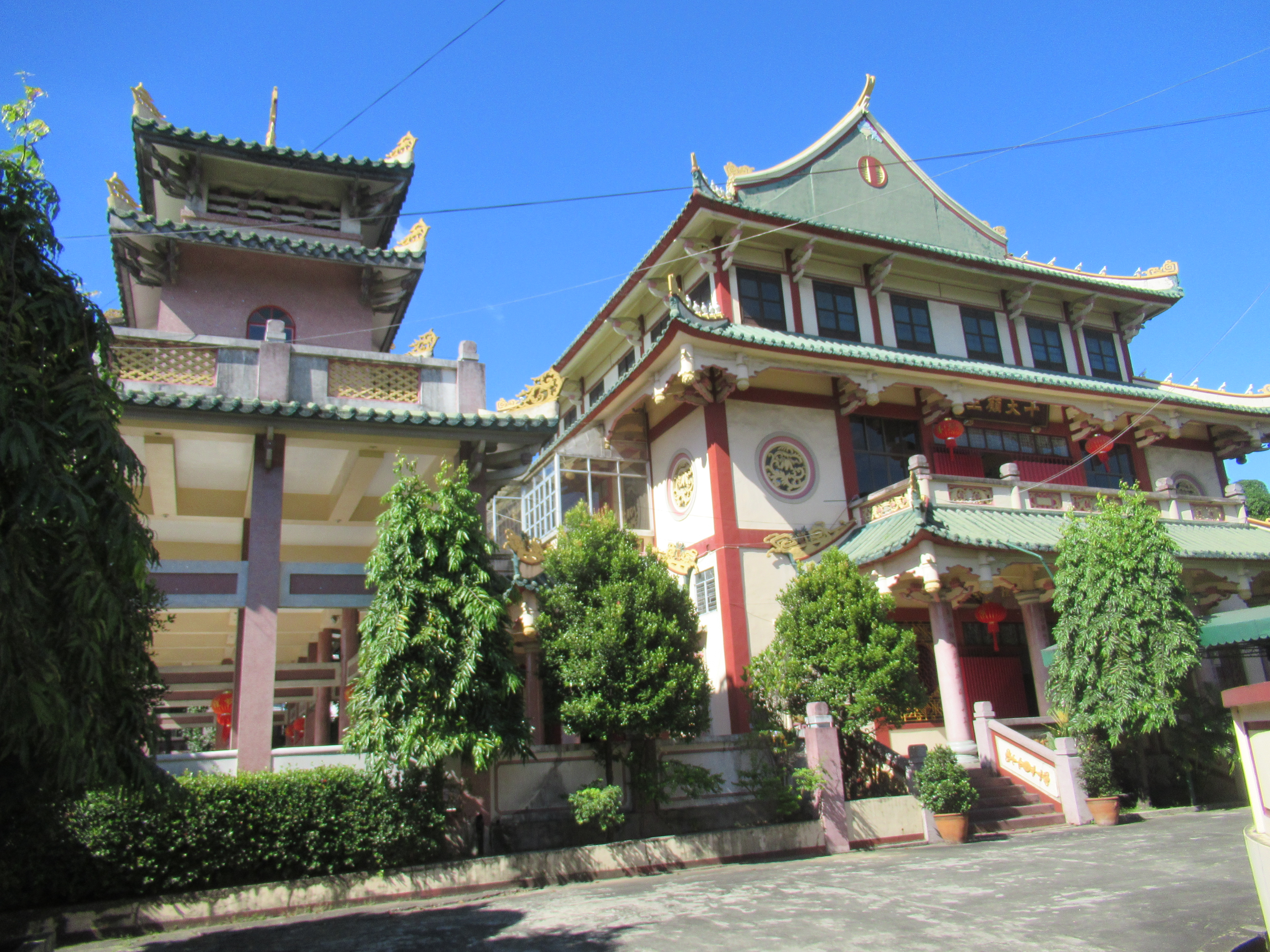
- Hwa Chong Buddhist Temple in Malabon

Total population
- 160,000

Regions with significant populations
- Throughout the Philippines

Buddhism is a minor religion in the Philippines. A recent nation-wide census in 2020 showed that the number of Buddhists in the country was at 160,000 adherents out of 112.2 million. This is much lower to what was initially estimated by a presenter at the United Nations in 2016, where it was initially thought to be at 2%. Buddhism is practiced by native Filipinos, Filipinos of Indian descent and by Filipinos of Chinese descent. The number of Buddhists in the country has been dwindling due to the lack or no significant presence of Buddhist missionary works where the teachings of the Buddha are translated and taught to the native regional languages. Unlike Christian missionaries which have expanded in the country further, Buddhist missionaries tend to be lax and less assertive, thus ineffective. Because of the lack of Buddhist missionaries, Filipinos who would like to convert to Buddhism find it hard to locate trained Buddhists who would help them in self-conversion.

== History ==
Buddhist expansion in Asia, from Buddhist heartland in northern India (dark orange) starting 5th century BCE, to Buddhist majority realm (orange), and historical extent of Buddhism influences (yellow). Mahāyāna (red arrow), Theravāda (green arrow), and Tantric-Vajrayāna (blue arrow). The overland and maritime "Silk Roads" were interlinked and complementary, forming what scholars have called the "great circle of Buddhism".

The oldest archeological evidence of Buddhism's presence in the Philippines date back to the 9th century, when Theravada Buddhism and Vajrayana Buddhism were known as the dominant branches of Buddhism. No early Buddhist written records have yet to be found from this era, likely due to the perishable nature of the writing mediums, which were bamboo and leaves. A few records also note of the historical presence of Buddhism in the islands prior to the arrival of colonizers and Mahayana Buddhism. Independent states that comprise the Philippines were known to have Buddhist adherents, although the majority of the population adhered instead to the indigenous Philippine folk religions.

Vajrayāna in the Philippines was also linked through the maritime trade routes with its counterparts in India, Sri Lanka, Champa, Cambodia, China and Japan, to the extent that it is hard to separate them completely and is better to speak of a complex of esoteric Buddhism in medieval Maritime Asia. In many of the key South Asian port cities that saw the growth of Esoteric Buddhism, the tradition coexisted alongside Shaivism.

Both the Śrīvijayan empire in Sumatra and the Majapahit empire in Java were unknown in Western history until 1918, when George Coedes of the Ecole Francaise d'Extreme Orient postulated their existence because they had been mentioned in the records of the Chinese Tang and Sung imperial dynasties. Yi Jing, a Chinese monk and scholar, stayed in Sumatra from 687 to 689 on his way to India. He wrote on the Srivijaya's splendour: "Buddhism was flourishing throughout the islands of Southeast Asia. Many of the kings and the chieftains in the islands in the southern seas admire and believe in Buddhism, and their hearts are set on accumulating good action." The Srivijaya empire flourished as a Buddhist cultural centre over 600 years from 650 to 1377 in Palembang, Sumatra. Built as a mandala on a hill from 770 to 825 in central Java, the Borobodur stands today as a living testament of the Srivijaya empire's grandeur. Three generations of the Sailendra kings built the temple that displays a three-dimensional view of the Vajrayāna Buddhist cosmology. Later on, the Javanese Majapahit empire took control over the Srivijaya and became the leading Buddhist cultural centre from 1292 to 1478 in Southeast Asia. Both empires supplemented their otherwise austere practice of Theravāda with the rituals of Vajrayāna in the 7th century.

In and of itself not a school of Buddhism, Vajrayāna, literally meaning "adamantine" or "diamond vehicle" and also known as Tantric or Mantrayāna Buddhism, is instead practiced as a tradition on top of Theravāda or Mahāyāna Buddhism. Ritual practice rather than meditation is the distinguishing mark of Vajrayāna. In addition, its esoteric teachings may only be conveyed through dharma transmission.

=== Archaeological findings ===
The Philippines's archaeological finds include a few Buddhist artifacts. The style exhibits Vajrayāna influence, and most of them dated to the 9th century. The artifacts reflect the iconography of the Śrīvijayan empire's Vajrayāna and its influences on the Philippines's early states. The artifacts' distinct features point to their production in the islands, and they hint at the artisan's or goldsmith's knowledge of Buddhist culture and literature because the artisans have made these unique works of Buddhist art. They imply also the presence of Buddhist believers in the places where these artifacts turned up. These places extended from the Agusan-Surigao area in Mindanao island to Cebu, Palawan, and Luzon islands. Hence, Vajrayāna ritualism must have spread far and wide throughout the archipelago.

In 1225, China's Zhao Rugua, a superintendent of maritime trade in Fukien province wrote the book entitled Zhu Fan Zhi (Chinese: 諸番志; lit. 'Account of the Various Barbarians'), in which he described trade with a country called Ma-i in the island of Mindoro in Luzon, which was a pre-Hispanic Philippine state. In it he said:

The country of Mai is to the north of Borneo. The natives live in large villages on the opposite banks of a stream and cover themselves with a cloth like a sheet or hide their bodies with a loin cloth. There are metal images of Buddhas of unknown origin scattered about in the tangled wilds.

"The gentleness of Tagalog customs that the first Spaniards found, very different from those of other provinces of the same race and in Luzon itself, can very well be the effect of Buddhism "There are copper Buddha's" images.

The gold statue of the deity Tara is the most significant Buddhist artifact. In the Vajrayāna tradition, Tara symbolizes the Absolute in its emptiness as the wisdom heart's essence that finds its expression through love and through compassion. The Vajrayāna tradition also tells about the outpouring of the human heart's compassion that manifests Tara and about the fascinating story of the Bodhisattva of Compassion shedding a tear out of pity for the suffering of all sentient beings when he hears their cries. The tear creates a lake where a lotus flower emerges. It bears Tara, who relieves their sorrow and their pain.

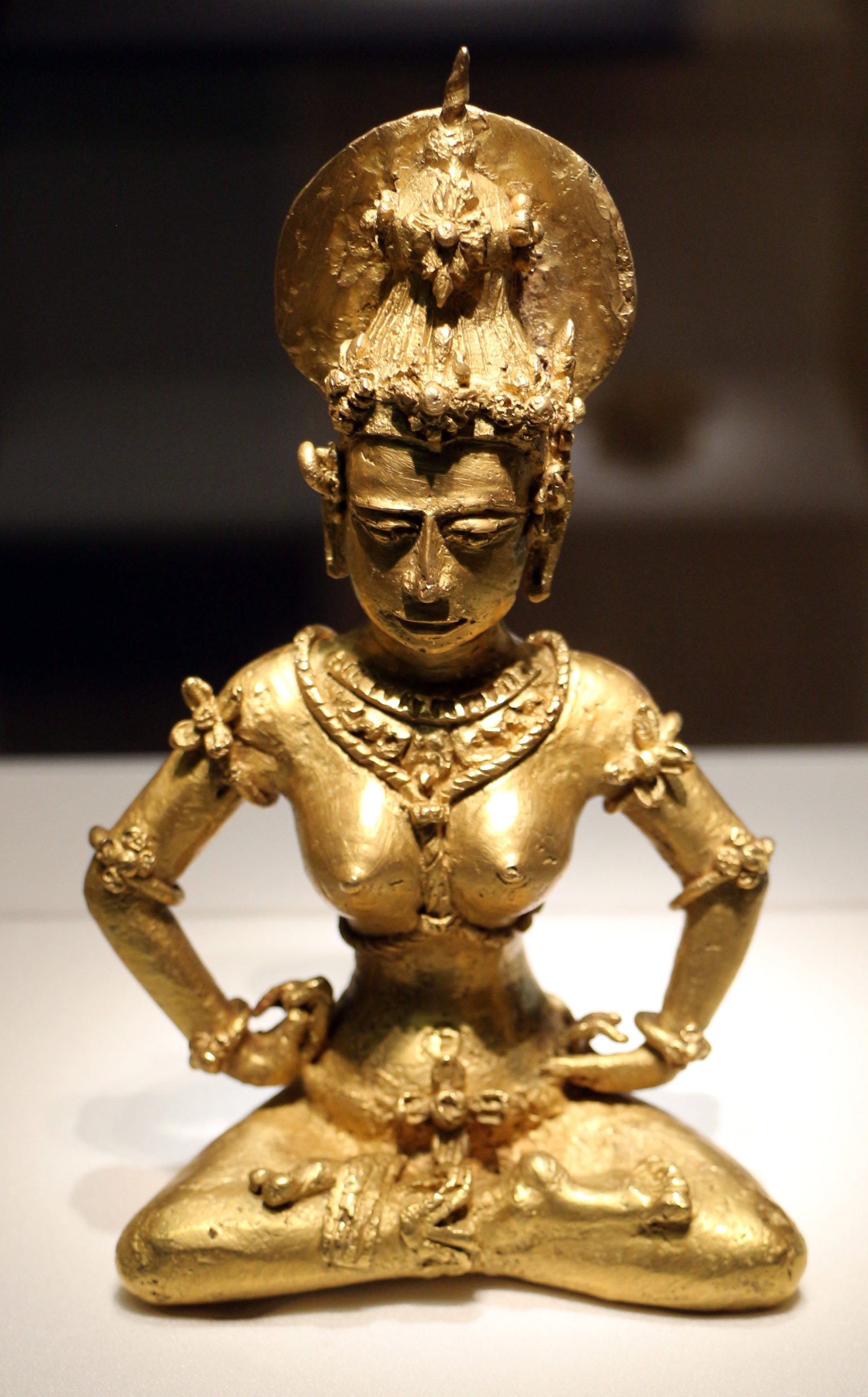
The Agusan image at the collections of the Field Museum of Natural History in Chicago.

The Agusan image was discovered in 1918 in Esperanza, Agusan, and it has been kept in the Field Museum of Natural History in Chicago, Illinois since the 1920s. Henry Otley Beyer, the Philippines' pioneer anthropologist-archaeologist, and some experts have agreed on its identity and have dated it to belong within 900–950 CE, which covers the Sailendra period of the Srivijaya empire. They can not place, however, the Agusan image's provenance because it has distinct features.

In the archipelago that was to become the Philippines, the statues of Hindu and Buddhist gods were hidden to prevent destruction during the arrival of Islam, a religion which destroyed all cult images. One statue, a 4-pound gold statue of Vajrayana Buddhist goddess "Golden Tara", was found in Mindanao in 1917. The statue denoted the Agusan Image and is now in the Field Museum of Natural History, Chicago. The image is that of a Buddhist female deity, seated cross-legged. It is made of twenty-one carat gold and weighs nearly four pounds. It has a richly ornamented headdress and many ornaments in the arms and other parts of the body. Scholars date it to the late 13th or early 14th century. It was made by local artists, perhaps copying from an imported Javanese model. The gold that was used to craft this statue was from Mindanao, as Javanese miners were known to have been engaged in gold mining in Butuan at this time. The existence of these gold mines, this artifact, and the presence of "foreigners" suggests that there existed some foreign trade, gold being the main element in the barter economy, and of cultural and social contact between the natives and "foreigners".

As previously stated, this statue is not in the Philippines. Louise Adriana Wood (whose husband, Leonard Wood, was the military-governor of the Moro Province in 1903–1906 and governor general in 1921–1927) raised funds for its purchase by the Chicago Museum of Natural History. It is now on display in the museum's Gold Room. According to Professor Beyer, considered the "Father of Philippine Anthropology and Archeology", a woman in 1917 found it on the left bank of the Wawa River near Esperanza, Agusan, projecting from the silt in a ravine after a storm and flood. From her hands, it passed into those of Bias Baklagon, a local government official. Shortly after, ownership was passed to the Agusan Coconut Company, to whom Baklagon owed a considerable debt. Wood bought it from the coconut company.

A golden statuette of the Hindu-Buddhist goddess Kinnara was also found in an archeological dig in Esperanza, Agusan del Sur.

The Philippines's archaeological finds include many ancient gold artifacts. Most of them have been dated to belong to the 9th century iconography of the Srivijaya empire. The artifacts' distinct features point to their production in the islands. It is probable that they were made locally because archaeologist Peter Bellwood discovered the existence of an ancient goldsmith's shop that made the 20-centuries-old lingling-o, or omega-shaped gold ornaments in Batanes. Archaeological finds include Buddhist artifacts, the style of which are of Vajrayāna influence.

The other finds include Garuda, a legendary bird-like figure in Buddhism and Hinduism, and several Padmapani images. Padmapani is also known as a manifestation or avatar of Avalokitesvara, the enlightened being or Bodhisattva of Compassion.

Surviving Buddhist images and sculptures are primarily found in and at Tabon Cave. Recent research conducted by Philip Maise included the discovery of giant sculptures, and he also discovered what he believes to be cave paintings within the burial chambers in the caves depicting the Journey to the West. Scholars such as Milton Osborne emphasize that despite these beliefs being originally from India, they reached the Philippines through Southeast Asian cultures with Austronesian roots. Artifacts reflect the iconography of the Vajrayāna tradition and its influences on the Philippines's early states.

- Bronze Lokesvara – This is bronze statue of Lokesvara was found in Isla Puting Bato in Tondo, Manila.
- Buddha Amithaba bass relief – The Ancient Batangueños were influenced by India as shown in the origin of most languages from Sanskrit and certain ancient potteries. A Buddhist image was reproduced in mould on a clay medallion in bas-relief from the municipality of Calatagan. According to experts, the image in the pot strongly resembles the iconographic portrayal of Buddha in Siam, India, and Nepal. The pot shows Buddha Amithaba in the tribhanga pose inside an oval nimbus. Scholars also noted that there is a strong Mahayanic orientation in the image, since the Boddhisattva Avalokitesvara is also depicted.
- Golden Garuda of Palawan – Another gold artifact, from the Tabon Caves in the island of Palawan, is an image of Garuda, the bird who is the mount of Vishnu. The discovery of sophisticated Hindu imagery and gold artifacts in Tabon Caves has been linked to those found from Oc Eo, in the Mekong Delta in Southern Vietnam.
- Bronze Ganesha statues – A crude bronze statue of a Hindu Deity Ganesha was found by Henry Otley Beyer in 1921 in an ancient site in Puerto Princesa, Palawan and in Mactan, Cebu.The crude bronze statue indicates its local reproduction.
- Mactan Alokitesvara – Excavated in 1921 in Mactan, Cebu by H.O.Beyer, the statue is bronze and may be of Siva-Buddhist blend rather than "pure Buddhist".
- The Golden Tara
- Golden Kinnari
- Padmapani and Nandi images – Padmapani is also known as a manifestation of Avalokitesvara, the wisdom being or Bodhisattva of Compassion. Golden jewelry found so far include rings, some surmounted by images of Nandi – the sacred bull, linked chains, inscribed gold sheets, gold plaques decorated with repoussé images of Hindu deities.
- The Laguna Copperplate Inscription – Found in 1989, it suggests Indian cultural influence in the Philippines by 9th century AD, likely through Hinduism in Indonesia, prior to the arrival of European colonial empires in the 16th century.

==== Butuan ====
Evidence indicates that Butuan was in contact with the Song dynasty of China by at least 1001 CE. The Chinese annal Song Shih recorded the first appearance of a Butuan tributary mission (Li Yui-han 李竾罕 and Jiaminan) at the Chinese Imperial Court on March 17, 1001 CE and it described Butuan (P'u-tuan) as a small Hindu country with a Buddhist monarchy in the sea that had a regular connection with the Champa kingdom and intermittent contact with China under the Rajah named Kiling. The rajah sent an envoy under I-hsu-han, with a formal memorial requesting equal status in court protocol with the Champa envoy. The request was denied later by the Imperial court, mainly because of favoritism over Champa.

==== Mindoro ====
In 1225, China's Zhao Rugua, a superintendent of maritime trade in Fukien province, wrote the book titled Account of the Various Barbarians (Chinese: 諸番志), in which he described trade with a country called Ma-i in the island of Mindoro in Luzon, which was a pre-Hispanic Philippine state. The book describes the presence of metal images of Buddhas of unknown origin scattered about in the tangled wilds. The gentleness of Tagalog customs that the first Spaniards found, were very different from those of other provinces of the same race and in Luzon itself, can very well be the effect of Buddhism.

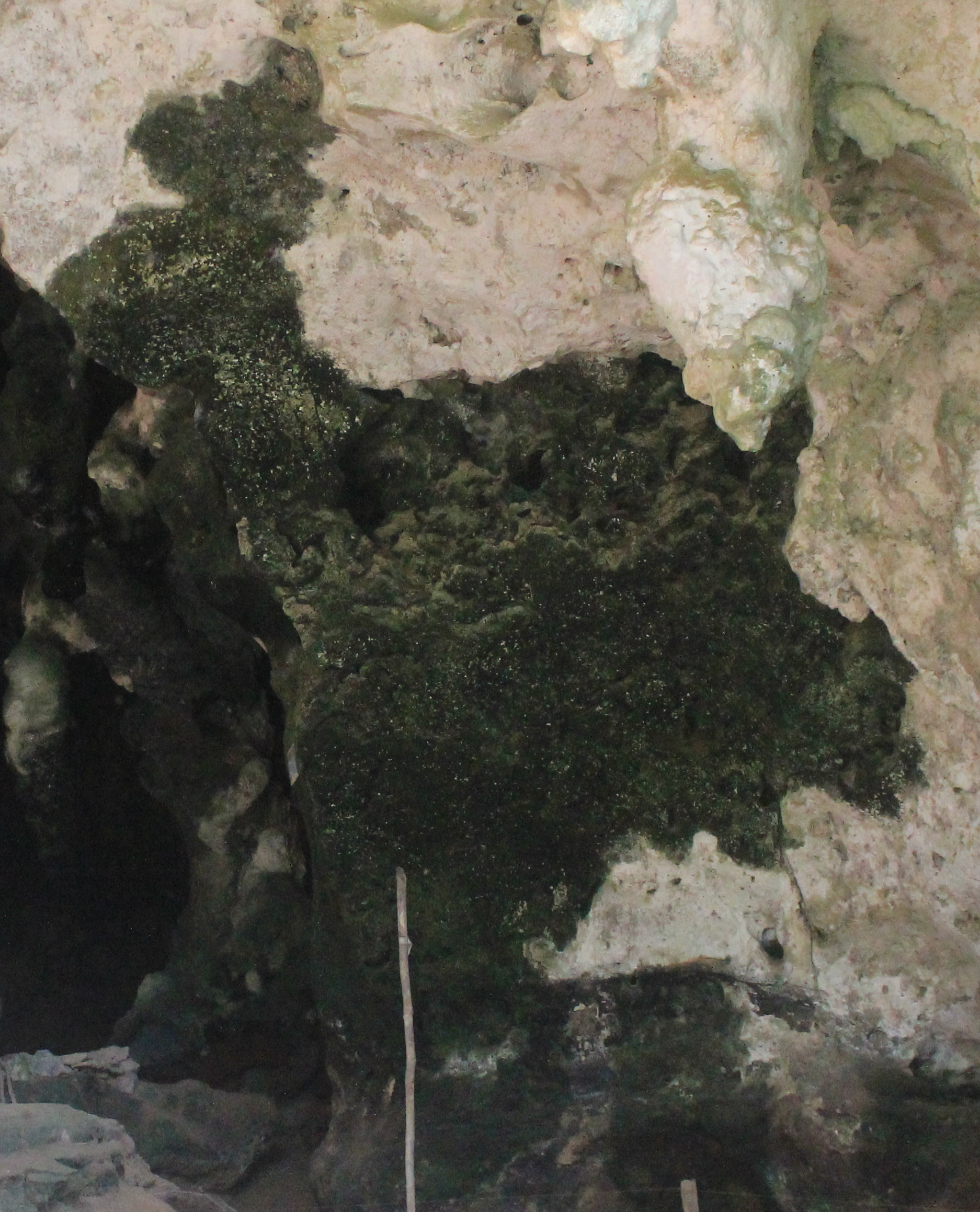
Example of what Maise believed to be a cave painting depicting Manjusri, in Tabon Caves in Palawan.

==== Palawan ====
In the 13th century, Buddhism and Hinduism were introduced to the people of Palawan through the Srivijaya and Majapahit . Surviving Buddhist images and sculptures are primarily found in and at Tabon Cave. Recent research conducted by Philip Maise has included the discovery of giant sculptures and cave paintings within the burial chambers in the caves depicting the Journey to the West.

==== Tondo ====
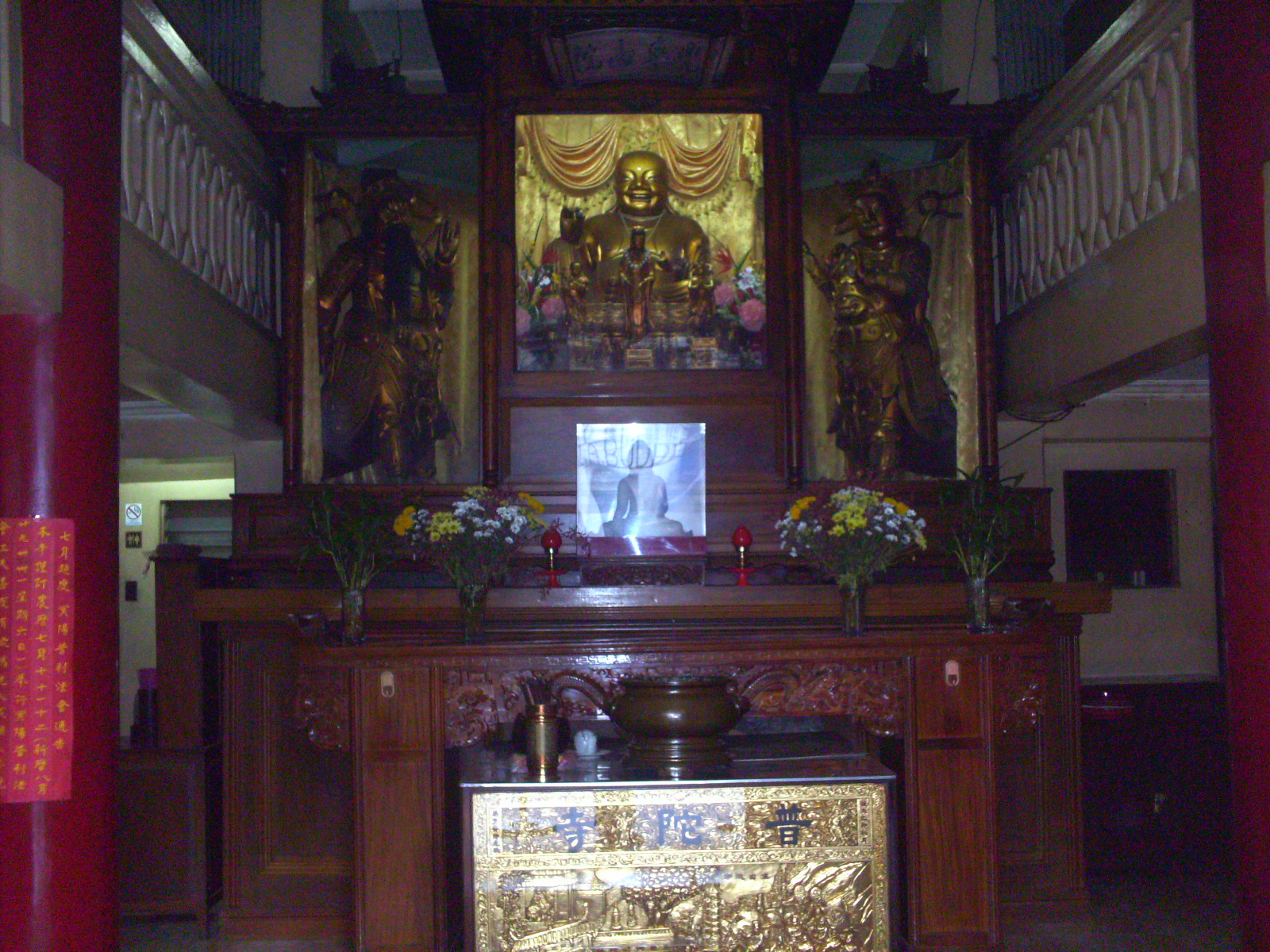
The Main Altar of a Buddhist Temple in Masangkay Street, Tondo, Manila.

A relic of a bronze statue of Lokesvara was found in Isla Puting Bato in Tondo, Manila, and the Laguna Copperplate Inscription, which specifically points to an Indian cultural (linguistic) influence in Tondo, does not explicitly discuss religious practices. However, some contemporary Buddhist practitioners believe that its mention of the Hindu calendar month of Vaisakha (which corresponds to April/May in the Gregorian Calendar) implies a familiarity with the Hindu sacred days celebrated during that month.

=== Present day ===
Both extant schools of Buddhism are present in the Philippines. There are Mahāyāna monasteries, temples, lay organizations, meditation centers and groups, such as Fo Guang Shan, Soka Gakkai International, and an international Nichiren Buddhist organization such as Nichiren Sho-shu Hokaiji Temple in Cubao, city of Quezon founded in Japan. The first temple of Tibetan Buddhism in the country was established in 1992 in Quezon City. The Maha Bodhi Society's Zen circle was founded in October 1998. Fo Guang Shan Manila is the main branch of the Fo Guang Shan Buddhist Order in the Philippines, which has several temples across the country.

Despite being located in Southeast Asia, the Theravāda school has but a marginal presence. The Philippine Theravāda Buddhist Fellowship regularly holds fellowship meetings and promotes Theravāda Buddhism in the country. There is also a nonsectarian S. N. Goenka vipassanā meditation center in Quezon Province.

== Status of Buddhist missionary work ==
There are 39,158 Buddhists in the Philippines, as per the recent 2020 national survey on religious adherence, which is roughly 0.03% of the national population of 112.2 million people. The Philippines currently has the smallest Buddhist population in Southeast Asia, which is home to five Buddhist-majority sovereign nations. The Thai Buddhist Sangha (Mahāthera Samāgama), the most influential and powerful Buddhist sangha in Southeast Asia, attempted to initiate a Buddhist missionary work in the Philippines to convert the people to Theravada Buddhism in the 1970s, however, the plan was not followed through after the initial contact. At the present, no Buddhist Sangha has seriously tried to spearhead Buddhist missionary works or conversions in the country, hence, the dwindling number of Buddhists in the Philippines. There are also no Filipino Buddhist monks yet that have been trained by the Thai Buddhist Sangha, or other Buddhist sanghas, in the practice of missionary work. There are some Buddhist temples and halls in the country, but as there are no Buddhist monks in the Philippines trained in missionary work, most temples today have operated as "meditation centers", rather than epicenters of the Buddhist faith and missionary works. In some cases, Buddhist monks from neighboring states have stayed in local Filipino Buddhist temples, but they have not spearheaded any form of missionary work.

== Buddhist teachings translated in the native languages ==
In 1956, the entire Buddhist sacred texts of Navayana Buddhism entitled The Buddha and His Dhamma was published in the English language. It was again republished in 1973, and is now easily accessible and downloadable in the Philippines through online means.

In the 1970s, Thailand's Sangha Supreme Council (Mahāthera Samāgama), made contacts with the Philippines to re-introduce Theravada Buddhism, including translating Buddhist texts in the local languages. However, the contacts were not followed through. English translation of the Thai Buddhist tradition are also difficult to find in the Philippines.

In 2011, the Buddhist teachings were translated and published in Filipino for the first time, and became open and downloadable to the general public for free. The texts were translated by Japan's Society for the Promotion of Buddhism (Bukkyo Dendo Kyokai), who adheres to Mahayana Buddhism. No trained Buddhist monks were however assigned to foster and convey the teachings within the translated texts to the general Filipino public. English translations of Mahayana Buddhist texts are seldom accessible in the Philippines.

In 2021, translating the Buddhist teachings in the local languages of the Philippines were undertaken by Taiwan's Fo Guang Shan, who adheres to Mahayana Buddhism, and is currently ongoing.

In addition to the lack of Buddhist texts in a Philippine language, all current Buddhist temples in the country are named after a foreign language, mostly Chinese or Chinese-English names, creating a facade of exclusivity for Chinese people. This has hindered the spread of Buddhism among common Filipinos since there is a widespread view among the Chinese wherein Chinese people must not inter-marry with native Filipinos as the Chinese generally view Filipino as below them. In many cases, Chinese sons or daughters who marry a Filipino are stripped of inheritance largely due to racial views by the Chinese against Filipinos. In contrast, some Buddhist cultures that are more accepting include the lineages under the Thai Theravada, Japanese Mahayana, Taiwanese Mahayana, and Tibetan Vajrayana.

== Buddhist Orders Present in the Philippines ==
Some of the Buddhist orders or lineages that have established temples in the country include the following below. The differences of these orders are similar to the difference of Christian churches such as the Roman Catholic Church, the Aglipayan Church, and so on.

- Tzu Chi (Ciji) - a Humanistic Buddhism order which originates from Taiwan and founded by Taiwan-born Cheng Yen, one of the four Buddhist masters of Taiwan. Of the Buddhist orders present in the Philippines, Tzu Chi (or Ciji) is the only order which prioritizes secular humanitarian work, sending millions of aid to the Philippines during the annual typhoon season. The order is also the most popular Buddhist tradition in Taiwan. Chen Yen is the first female Buddhist leader to have been awarded the Ramon Magsaysay Award.
- Fo Guang Shan - a Humanistic Buddhism order which originates from Taiwan and founded by Chinese-born Hsing Yun. It established the Fo Guang Shan Mabuhay Temple and operates the Buddha's Light International Association – Philippines.
- Chung Tai Shan - a Chan Buddhism order which originates from Taiwan and founded by Chinese-born Wei Chueh, one of the four Buddhist masters of Taiwan. It established the Ocean Sky Chan Monastery.
- Theravada - the Theravada order, which is the majority-Buddhist tradition in Southeast Asia, has established the homegrown Philippine Theravada Buddhist Fellowship in the country. The order has one temple.
- Vajrayana - also known as Tibetan Buddhism, the order has established the Philippine Palyul Buddhist Temple in the country. The order follows the teachings of the Dalai Lama, who has been awarded the Ramon Magsaysay Award.
- Nichiren Shoshu - a Nichiren Buddhism order which originates from Japan. It has one temple in the country.
- Soka Gakkai - a Shinshukyu Buddhism order which originates from Japan.
- Chinese - most Chinese Buddhists in the country follow a form of Chan Buddhism under the larger Chinese Buddhism tradition which originates from mainland China. An example of their temple is Seng Guan Temple, which mostly has Chinese exclusivity.

== Incorporation of folk religion ==
The Tagalog and Visayan belief system was more or less anchored on the idea that the world is inhabited by spirits and supernatural entities, both good and bad, and that respect must be accorded to them through worship. The elements of Buddhist and Hindu beliefs have been syncretistically adapted or incorporated in the indigenous folk religions. In the Philippine mythology, a diwata (derived from Sanskrit devata देवता; encantada in Spanish) is a type of deity or spirit. The term "diwata" has taken on levels of meaning since its assimilation into the mythology of the pre-colonial Filipinos. The term is traditionally used in the Visayas, Palawan, and Mindanao regions, while the term anito is used in parts of Luzon region. Both terms are used in Bicol, Marinduque, Romblon, and Mindoro, signifying a 'buffer zone' area for the two terms. While the spelling of the name "Bathala" given by Pedro Chirino in "Relación de las Islas Filipinas" (1595–1602) was perhaps a combination of two different spellings of the name from older documents such as "Badhala" in "Relacion de las Costumbres de Los Tagalos" (1589, Juan de Plasencia) and "Batala" in "Relacion de las Yslas Filipinas" (1582, Miguel de Loarca), the latter was supposedly the correct spelling in Tagalog since the letter "h" was silent in Spanish. Bathala or Batala was apparently derived from Sanskrit "bhattara" (noble lord), which appeared as the sixteenth-century title "batara" in the southern Philippines and Borneo. In the Indonesian language, "batara" means "god", its feminine counterpart was "batari". It is worth noting that in Malay, "betara" means holy, and was applied to the greater Hindu gods in Java, and was also assumed by the ruler of Majapahit.

== Influence on Philippine languages ==
Sanskrit and, to a lesser extent, Pāli have left lasting marks on the vocabulary of almost every indigenous language of the Philippines.

=== On Kapampangan ===
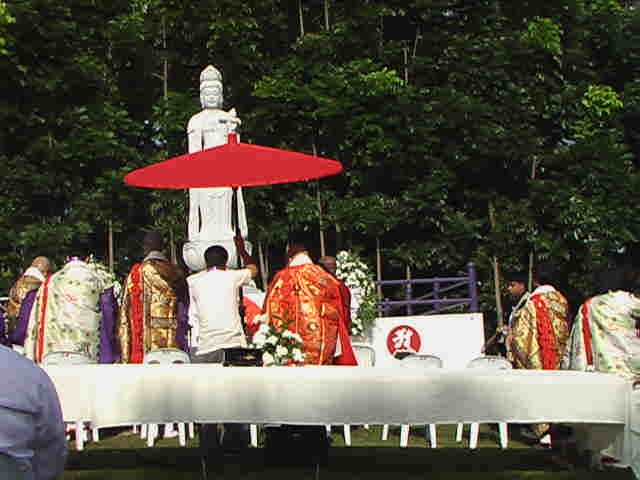
Shingon Buddhist Service at the Heiwa Kannon Shrine in Clark Field, Pampanga, October 2003

- kalma "fate" from Sanskrit karma
- damla "divine law" from Sanskrit dharma
- mantala "magic formulas" from Sanskrit mantra
- upaia "power" from Sanskrit or Pāli upāya
- lupa "face" from Sanskrit rūpa
- sabla "every" from Sanskrit sarva
- lau "eclipse" from Sanskrit rāhu
- galura "giant eagle (a surname)" from Sanskrit Garuḍa
- laksina "south (a surname)" from Sanskrit dakṣiṇa
- laksamana "admiral (a surname)" from Sanskrit lakṣmaṇa

=== On Tagalog ===
- budhi "conscience" from Sanskrit bodhi
- dalita "suffering" from Sanskrit dalita
- diwa "Spirit; Soul" from Sanskrit jīva
- dukha "one who suffers" Or "Poor" from Pāli dukkha
- diwata "deity, nymph" from Pāli deva
- guro "teacher" from Sanskrit guru
- sampalataya "faith" from Sanskrit sampratyaya
- mukha "face" from Pāli mukha
- laho "eclipse" from Sanskrit rāhu
- tala "star" from Sanskrit tārā

== See also ==
- Seng Guan Temple
- Lon Wa Buddhist Temple
- Ocean Sky Chán Monastery, Philippine branch temple of Taiwan's Chung Tai Chan Monastery
- IBPS Manila, Philippine branch of Taiwan's Fo Guang Shan Buddhist Order
- BLIA Philippines, Philippine chapter of Buddha's Light International Association
