= Fo Guang Shan Mabuhay Temple =

Buddhist temple in Manila, Philippines

Coordinates: 14°33′38″N 120°59′31″E

The logo for IBPS Manila

Fo Guang Shan Mabuhay Temple (also known as Fo Guang Shan Manila) (Chinese: 佛光山萬年寺) is the Philippine branch of the Taiwan affiliated Fo Guang Shan Buddhist Order in the Philippines. As do all branch temples, way-places, and organizations of Fo Guang Shan, the branch follows Humanistic Buddhism, a modernized style of Buddhist teaching as propagated by Hsing Yun, spiritual founder and teacher of the order.

== History ==
In 1989, while monks from the Fo Guang Shan order were preaching Buddhist teachings on the southern islands of Cebu and Bacolod, they received requests from lay followers in Manila. In November 1992, Venerable Yung Guang brought with her statues of the Three Treasure Buddhas (namely Sakyamuni, Amitabha, and Bhaisajyaguru) to the famous Ongpin Street, in Manila's Chinatown. In the beginning, Venerable Yung Guang founded the small Manila Buddhist Center in a premises offered by lay devotees.

After half a year of preaching, the number of lay followers increased, and the space was no longer sufficient to accommodate all of them. Having realized the great potential in the capital of the Philippines, Venerable Yung Guang invited Venerable Tzu Chuang, director of the Overseas Supervisory Council and senior bhikkuni of the Fo Guang Shan order, to come to Manila to inspect a historical building, which was the former USSR Embassy, and renamed it the "Manila Lecture Hall". This constituted a new page in the history of Buddhist preaching in the Philippines.

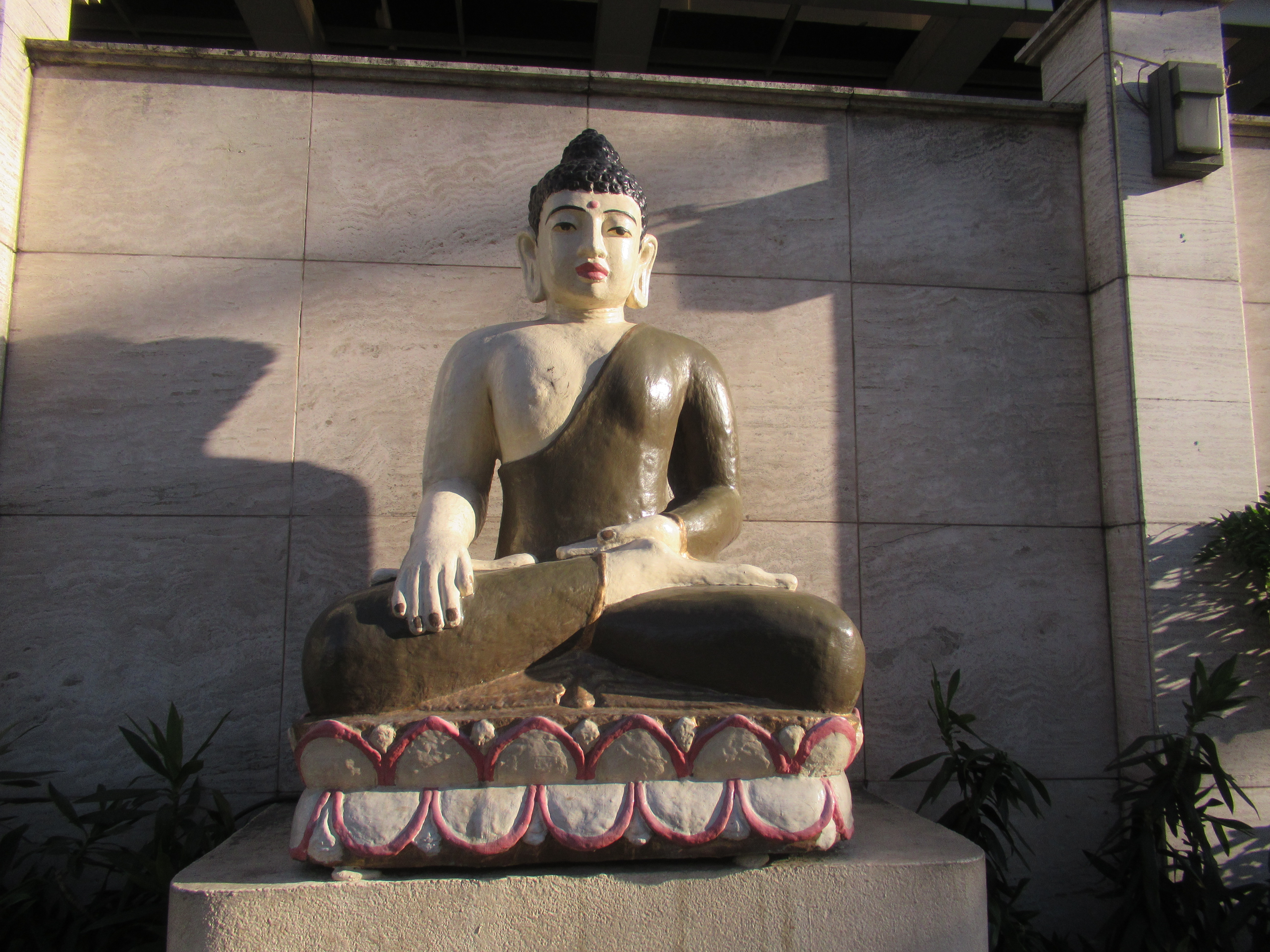
Fo Guang Shan Mabuhay Temple (Malate)

Following the guiding principles set out by Fo Guang Shan, the Manila Lecture Hall propagated Dharma through education, cultural activities, charitable programs, and Buddhist practices. Activities such as Youth Summer Camps, Children's Summer Camps, Filipino children's classes, and lectures on Buddhism were conducted regularly.

With the assistance of the local Buddhist community, a seven-day exhibit on hundreds of Buddhist statues from private collections was held at the Century Park Hotel. This was an unprecedented undertaking in the history of Buddhism in the Philippines which attracted a huge number of Buddhists and non-Buddhists who came to appreciate Buddhist art.

One of the Manila Lecture Hall's charitable programs was to help Filipinos in times of natural calamities while respecting local religions and customs. Thus, the Manila Lecture Hall steadily integrated itself into the society and culture of the Philippines. It has also regularly been invited to take part in many inter-religious dialogues and other activities. Hundreds of university students who wished to learn more about Buddhism visit the temple every year to participate in various lectures.

Over the years, the cultural, educational and charitable programs organized by the temple have attracted an increasing number of participants and received recognition from both the lay and religious community. Consequently, it has changed its name to I.B.P.S. Manila and became the main branch of the Fo Guang Shan Temple in the Philippines. The temple was also relocated once again to a property beside the former location in preparation for the construction of the new I.B.P.S. building.

Under the direction of its head abbess, Venerable Yung Guang, who has been in the Philippines for twelve years, and together with the venerables and lay devotees of the Chu Un Temple in Cebu City, the Yuan Thong Temple in Bacolod, and the Ilo-ilo Fo Guang Vihara, IBPS Manila vowed to "sow the seeds of culture and education that help purify people’s minds in this beautiful archipelago".

== See also ==
- Seng Guan Temple, Tondo, Manila
- Lon Wa Buddhist Temple, Davao City, Mindanao
- Ocean Sky Chán Monastery, San Juan, Manila
- Buddha's Light International Association – Philippines
- Zu Lai Temple, Brazil
- Nan Hua Temple, South Africa
- Hsi Lai Temple, United States
- Chung Tian Temple, Australia
- Fo Guang Shan Buddha Museum
- Siddhartha (musical)
