= Four Heavenly Kings (Taiwan) =

Founders of Taiwanese Buddhist institutions

The Four Heavenly Kings or Four Great Mountains (Chinese: 四大名山) of Taiwan refers to four Buddhist masters in Taiwanese Buddhism who each founded an influential Buddhist institution in the country. The term draws its name from the Four Heavenly Kings who each rule over one of the heavenly realms in Buddhist cosmology. Like the Four Heavenly Kings mythology, each Buddhist teacher corresponds to one cardinal direction, based on where their organization is located in Taiwan. The corresponding institutions of the masters are referred to as the "Four Great Mountains".

The four masters and their corresponding institutions are:

- North (Jinshan): Master Sheng-yen (聖嚴, d. 2009) of Dharma Drum Mountain (法鼓山)
- South (Dashu): Master Hsing Yun (星雲, d. 2023) of Fo Guang Shan (佛光山)
- East (Hualien): Master Cheng Yen (證嚴) of the Tzu Chi Foundation (慈濟基金會)
- West (Nantou): Master Wei Chueh (惟覺, d. 2016) of Chung Tai Shan (中台山)

== Sheng Yen ==
Master Sheng Yen (22 January 1931 – 3 February 2009) was a Chinese Buddhist monk and religious scholar. He founded Dharma Drum Mountain, located at Jinshan District, New Taipei City, Taiwan in 1989. Dharma Drum Mountain focuses on educating the public in Buddhism with the goal of improving the world and establishing a "Pure Land on Earth" through Buddhist education.

Born Chang Baokang near Shanghai in mainland China, he became a monk at the age of 13. During the Chinese Civil War, he left the monkhood and went to Taiwan in 1949 by enlisting in a unit of the Nationalist Army. After leaving the army Sheng Yen returned to monkhood and became recognized as a Dharma Heir in both the Linji and Caodong traditions. Sheng Yen was a 57th generational dharma heir of Linji Yixuan in the Linji school (Japanese: Rinzai) and a third-generation dharma heir of Hsu Yun. In the Caodong (Japanese: Sōtō) lineage, Sheng Yen was a 52nd-generation Dharma heir of Dongshan Liangjie (807-869), and a direct Dharma heir of Dongchu (1908–1977).

Sheng Yen became a lecturer at Shan Dao Monastery in Taipei and then completed a master's degree (1971) and doctorate (1975) in Buddhist literature at Rissho University in Japan. At the time Sheng Yen was the only major Buddhist figure in Taiwan to have earned a doctorate from a reputable foreign university. Sheng Yen became abbot of Nung Chan in Taiwan in 1978 and founder of the Institute of Chung-Hwa Buddhist Culture in New York City in 1979. In 1985, he founded the Institute of Chung-Hwa Buddhist Studies in Taipei and the International Cultural and Educational Foundation of Dharma Drum Mountain in 1989.

Sheng Yen died from renal failure on 3 February 2009, while returning from National Taiwan University Hospital in Taipei.

== Hsing Yun ==
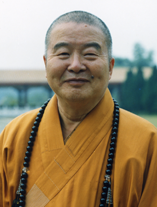
Master Hsing Yun, the founder of Fo Guang Shan.

Master Hsing Yun (19 August 1927 – 5 February 2023) was a Chinese Buddhist monk. He founded the Fo Guang Shan monastery in Dashu District, Kaohsiung, Taiwan in 1967. The monastery is the largest Buddhist temple in Taiwan and is the most comprehensive of the "Four Great Mountains". The organization follows Humanistic Buddhism, which focuses on using Buddhism to improve the current world, as well as promotes Chinese culture, Buddhist education and charity. The temple is known for its use of modern technology and teaching methods.

Hsing Yun entered the monastic life at the age of 12 and learned about Buddhist modernism in 1945 while studying at Jiaoshan Buddhist College. He fled mainland China to Taiwan in 1949 following the communist victory in the Chinese Civil War but was arrested along with several other Buddhist monastics. Hsing Yun and the others were eventually released after three weeks and Hsing Yun spent the next several years developing a large following and founding numerous temples. In 1966, Hsing Yun bought some land in Kaohsiung and started building a large monastery. After partial completion, the temple opened in 1967 and would later become the headquarters of Fo Guang Shan.

Fo Guang Shan entered mainland China in the early 21st century, focusing more on charity and Chinese cultural revival rather than Buddhist propagation in order to avoid conflict with the Chinese Communist Party, which opposes religion. Fo Guang Shan's presence in China increased under the premiership of General Secretary Xi Jinping after he started a program to revive traditional Chinese faiths. According to Hsing Yun, his goal in mainland China was to work with the mainland government to rebuild China's culture following the destruction of the Cultural Revolution, rather than promote Buddhism in the mainland.

== Cheng Yen ==
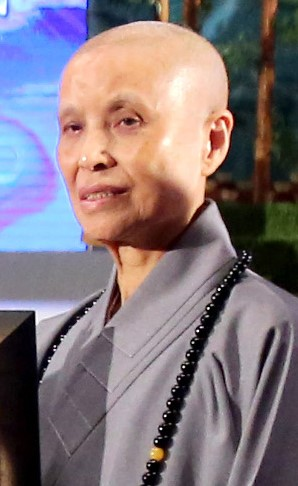
Master Chen Yen, the founder of the Tzu Chi Foundation.

Master Cheng Yen (born 4 May 1937) is a Taiwanese Buddhist nun (bhikkhuni), teacher, and philanthropist. She was a direct student of Master Ying Shun, a major figure in the early development of Humanistic Buddhism in Taiwan. She founded the Buddhist Compassion Relief Tzu Chi Foundation, ordinarily referred to as Tzu Chi, in 1966. The organization later became one of the largest humanitarian organizations in the world, and the largest Buddhist organization in Taiwan. Although still Buddhist in nature, the organization focuses primarily on charity and humanitarian work rather than Buddhist propagation.

Cheng Yen was born "Chin-Yun Wong" in 1937 in Kiyomizu Town, Taikō District, Taichū Prefecture, Japanese Taiwan (modern-day Qingshui, Taichung City, Taiwan). Unlike the other Four Heavenly Kings, Cheng Yen was born in Taiwan rather than mainland China. Cheng-Yen grew up under the Japanese occupation of Taiwan during World War II. Upon deciding to become a nun, Cheng Yen ran away to a temple in 1960, but was brought back home after three days. She ran away from home a second time in 1961 and wandered with a Buddhist master for two years until she encountered Venerable Master Yin Shun, whom she asked to be her mentor so she can be officially ordained. Master Yin Shun gave her the dharma name "Cheng Yen".

In 1966, Cheng Yen went to hospital in Fenglin and learned that a Taiwanese aborigine woman had a miscarriage and died when the family could not afford the 8,000 New Taiwan dollar deposit. Later that year, Cheng Yen had a conversation with three Catholic nuns at Pu Ming Temple. While the nuns admitted the profundity of Buddhist teachings, they noted that the Catholic Church had helped people around the world by building schools and hospitals and inquired, "But what has Buddhism done for society?" These two events made Master Cheng Yen realize that Buddhism had to do more than simply encouraging private cultivation of people's souls.

Master Cheng Yen established the Tzu Chi Foundation in 1966 as a group of thirty housewives who saved money to help needy families. Tzu Chi extended the scope of its work from helping needy families to medical aid in 1970. In 1986, Tzu Chi established its first Hospital in Hualien, and gradually expanded its work to disaster relief and environmental protection.

Tzu Chi is most well known for its work in disaster relief, one of the most iconic attributes of Tzu Chi disaster relief efforts is that volunteers not only provide short-term aid but also partake in long-term projects to rebuild affected communities. Tzu Chi often builds new homes, schools, hospitals, and places of worship (including churches and mosques for non-Buddhists) following a disaster.

== Wei Chueh ==
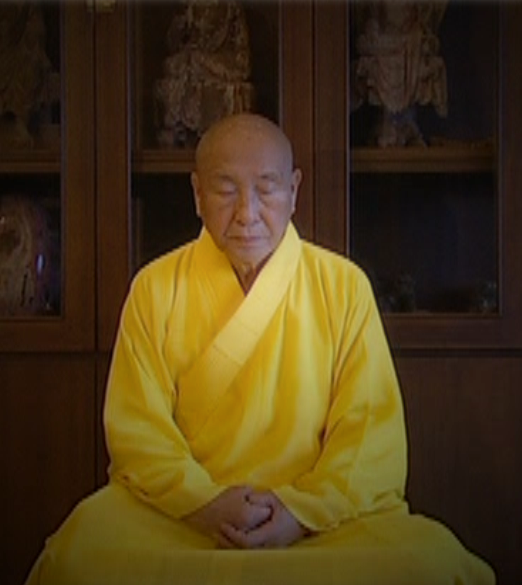
Master Wei Chueh, the founder of Chung Tai Chan

Master Wei Chueh (1928 – 8 April 2016) was a Chinese Buddhist monk. He founded the Chung Tai Shan Buddhist order in 1987, with its headquarters, the Chung Tai Chan Monastery in Nantou, Taiwan, being completed in 2001. Chung Tai Shan emphasizes meditation practice to purify the mind and encourages people to join the monastic life.

Wei Chueh was born in 1928 in Xikang (modern Sichuan), in mainland China. In 1963, he was ordained under Master Lin Yuan at the Shi Fan Da Jue Chan Monastery in Keelung, Taiwan. He received the higher ordination in 1967 at Daijue Temple in Keelung, Taiwan. He offered many retreats in Yilan, Hsinchu, and Hong Kong before settling into solitary seclusion at Yangmingshan near Wanli District, New Taipei. Master Wei Chueh became popular among people in the area in the 1980s for his meditation classes and retreats.

In 1987, he founded Lin Quan Temple in Taipei County. Wei Chueh became known for organizing seven-day Zen retreats and dharma assemblies, as well as his "lively and flexible" preaching style.

Due to the continuing growth of both lay disciples and monastic disciples, he founded the Chung Tai Chan Monastery in Nantou, Taiwan, in September 2001. Chung Tai Shan is the least socially engaged of the major Buddhist organizations, emphasizing purifying one's own mind and religious study over charity or disaster relief.

Master Wei Chueh died at the age of 88 on 8 April 2016.

== See also ==
- Buddhism in Taiwan
- Humanistic Buddhism
