= Stone Pagoda Statue in Dengyu Village =

The Dengyu Village Stone Pagoda Sculpture, also known as the Dengyu Stone Pagoda, was originally located in Dengyu Village, 9 kilometers south of Yushe County, Jinzhong, Shanxi Province, China. On May 24, 1965, it was included in the first batch, adjusted list, of Shanxi provincial cultural relics protection units. According to the inscription on the pagoda body, the pagoda was carved in the eighth year of the Kaiyuan era of the Tang dynasty, namely 720 CE. The Dengyu Stone Pagoda is 3.20 meters high and consists, from bottom to top, of a base, pagoda body, eaves including a flat platform, and finial. The pagoda body is square and 1.77 meters high. It is carved throughout in relief and painted, with one main Buddha image carved on each of its four sides. Commentators have noted that the Buddha images of the Dengyu Stone Pagoda are dignified in form, with rounded faces, full bodies, calm expressions, and flowing drapery, showing a clear High Tang style. The treatment of details such as the halo, ushnisha, facial features, chest and abdomen, legs, and garments prominently reflects the sculptural features of the Kaiyuan period. In 1996, the finial was stolen and its whereabouts remain unknown. In 1998, the pagoda body was stolen and was later sold to Taiwan. In 2015, a collector donated the pagoda body to Chung Tai Chan Monastery, which then donated it free of charge to the Shanxi Museum. The base and eaves of the stone pagoda have remained in Dengyu Village. The pagoda body is now held by the Shanxi Museum, while the finial remains missing.

== History ==
The Dengyu Stone Pagoda is a Tang dynasty sculptural pagoda. It was carved in the eighth year of the Kaiyuan era of the Tang dynasty, namely 720 CE. The pagoda body bears the inscription: “On the fifteenth day, wuchen, of the third month, whose first day was jiayin, in the gengshen year, the eighth year of Kaiyuan of the Great Tang.” Zhang Yuhuan’s Investigation and Study of Ancient Architecture mentions that the stone pagoda was located inside an ancient temple in Dengyu Village, and that local people said the pagoda had been dug out of farmland by farmers.On May 24, 1965, the Dengyu Village Stone Pagoda Sculpture was listed in the first batch, adjusted list, of Shanxi provincial cultural relics protection units.

In 1996, the finial of the stone pagoda was stolen and has remained missing since then. On September 10, 1998, the pagoda body was also stolen. According to Wang Taiming, then director of the Yushe County Cultural Relics Management Office, several thieves committed the crime with firearms. After cultural relics protection staff arrived, the thieves tied them to pillars with iron wire and beat them unconscious. The custodian was tied up for an entire night. The next day, villagers reported the case to the police.Two years later, the police arrested the thieves. The thieves confessed that they had sold the pagoda body to Taiwan for US$600,000. For more than ten years afterward, cultural relics workers received no information about the pagoda body.The base and eaves of the Dengyu Stone Pagoda remained in Dengyu Village.

In 2015, a private collector in Taiwan donated the pagoda body to Chung Tai Chan Monastery.After Venerable Weijue, the founding abbot of Chung Tai Chan Monastery, learned that the pagoda body came from Shanxi, he was willing to return it free of charge. In February 2016, Venerable Jianzun, the executive deputy abbot of Chung Tai Chan Monastery, visited the National Cultural Heritage Administration of the People’s Republic of China and mentioned that Chung Tai Chan Monastery possessed a stone pagoda that might be a stolen cultural relic from Shanxi Province. He hoped that the mainland side would assist in confirming its origin, and stated that if it was confirmed to be from Shanxi, the monastery was willing to return it. On April 8, 2016, Elder Weijue passed away, and his wish to donate the stone pagoda was carried out by his disciple Jiandeng. In May 2016, the National Cultural Heritage Administration organized experts to conduct a field investigation in Yushe, and preliminarily confirmed that the object held by Chung Tai Chan Monastery was the Dengyu Stone Pagoda. In July 2016, the Shanxi Provincial Cultural Relics Bureau organized experts to travel to Taiwan for appraisal. They determined that the stone quality, form, color, inscriptions, and other features of the pagoda body at Chung Tai Chan Monastery completely matched the Dengyu Stone Pagoda recorded in the archives of the second national cultural relics survey and in relevant books, confirming that it was the body of the Dengyu Stone Pagoda.

On August 13, 2016, at the opening ceremony of the Chung Tai World Museum, Shi Jinming, director of the Shanxi Museum, and Venerable Jianzun, executive deputy abbot of Chung Tai Chan Monastery, jointly signed the Agreement on the Donation of Cultural Relics from Chung Tai Chan Monastery in Taiwan to the Shanxi Museum, and a donation ceremony was held. On January 19, 2017, Liu Zhenghui, deputy director of the Shanxi Provincial Cultural Relics Bureau, led a team to Taiwan to receive the cultural relic. On January 24, the pagoda body arrived at the Shanxi Museum. According to earlier decisions by the National Cultural Heritage Administration and the Shanxi Provincial Cultural Relics Bureau, the pagoda body was to be held by the Shanxi Museum. On April 16, 2017, the “Return Ceremony for the Tang Dynasty Dengyu Stone Pagoda Body Donated by Chung Tai Chan Monastery in Taiwan”, jointly organized by the National Cultural Heritage Administration and the People’s Government of Shanxi Province, was held at the Shanxi Museum. The pagoda body of the Dengyu Stone Pagoda officially entered the collection of the Shanxi Museum. To show the full appearance of the stone pagoda, cultural relics workers made replicas of the base and eaves based on the originals, and made a replica of the finial according to available materials. These were combined with the pagoda body and displayed at the ceremony.On the same day, the Shanxi Museum opened the special exhibition “Return: Special Exhibition of the Tang Dynasty Dengyu Stone Pagoda”, which ran until May 21. At the donation ceremony, Zhang Fuming, vice governor of Shanxi Province, stated that security conditions at the original site in Dengyu, Yushe, would be improved as soon as possible so that the pagoda body could be reunited with the base and eaves.

== Form ==
The Dengyu Village Stone Pagoda Sculpture is made of sandstone. It is 3.20 meters high and is assembled from four parts, from bottom to top: the base, pagoda body, eaves including a flat platform, and finial.

The lower part of the base is circular and is carved with inverted lotus petals. The upper part of the base is octagonal. It has two tiers of horizontal bands at both the upper and lower parts, and the band surfaces are undecorated. On the waisted section between the upper and lower tiers of bands, each side is carved with one guardian figure, and the blank spaces are inscribed with the names of donors.

The pagoda body is slightly square-pillar shaped and is 1.77 meters high. It is carved throughout in relief and painted. Each of the four sides has a main Buddha image, while the four vertical edges are carved with bead-shaped columns. The upper, middle, and lower sections are each decorated with bundled lotus motifs. The main Buddha image on the front wears a robe covering both shoulders, has a flame-shaped mandorla, and sits in the lotus position on a waisted lotus pedestal supported by two guardian figures. On the bead-shaped columns at the front corners, each column is coiled by a dragon. The dragon heads are above the Buddha image and face each other.

The main Buddha image on the right side is seated with legs pendant, wearing a robe covering both shoulders. Each foot rests on a lotus flower, and the two lotus flowers are supported by the same guardian figure. To the left of the guardian figure are two lines of inscriptions, among which the three characters “Li Chonghui” can be identified.

The main Buddha image on the left side wears a robe covering both shoulders, has a flame-shaped mandorla, and sits in the lotus position on a lotus platform above a Sumeru pedestal. The lotus platform is supported by one guardian figure. On the waisted section of the Sumeru pedestal is the inscription: “On the fifteenth day, wuchen, of the third month, whose first day was jiayin, in the gengshen year, the eighth year of Kaiyuan of the Great Tang.” On one side of the inscription is carved “Yunqiwei Geng Xuan?”, with the final character unclear, possibly the character “zhi”. According to research, Yunqiwei was a lower-middle-ranking military official in the Tang dynasty, ranked seventh grade, first class. On the other side is carved “Geng Xuanqing”, and to the right of the guardian figure is carved “Wang Huaizhen”.

The main Buddha image on the back also wears a robe covering both shoulders and has a flame-shaped mandorla. Its hands are placed in front of the chest, and it stands on a lotus platform above a Sumeru pedestal. On the waisted section of the Sumeru pedestal is the inscription “Li Xuanshou, Li Chongxuan, Li Huanfu”.

The eaves are also octagonal, with a flat platform above them. Above the eaves is the finial. The second pagoda body above the flat platform is octagonal, with a guardian figure carved on each side. Above the second pagoda body is an octagonal roof, beneath which three tiers of corbelled eaves project outward.

Commentators have regarded the Dengyu Stone Pagoda as elegant, simple, and solemn.Its Buddha images have rounded faces, full bodies, calm expressions, and flowing drapery, showing a High Tang style. The treatment of details such as the halo, ushnisha, facial features, chest and abdomen, legs, and garments reflects the sculptural style of the Kaiyuan period. The Dengyu Stone Pagoda has importance for the study of Tang dynasty Buddhist art and Tang dynasty sculpture.Zhang Yuhuan once commented in his book that “this is the finest one among Tang dynasty sculptural pagodas”.
