= Cheng Yen =

Taiwanese Buddhist nun (born 1937)

Master Cheng Yen
- 證嚴
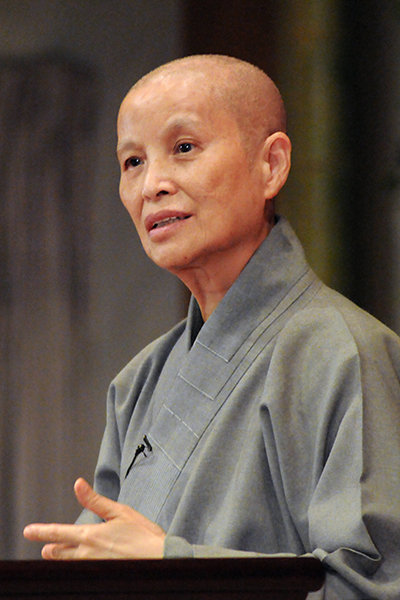
- Cheng Yen in 2016
- Title: Master

Personal life
- Born: Chin-Yun Wong; 4 May 1937 (age 89) Kiyomizu Town, Taikō District, Taichū Prefecture, Taiwan (modern-day Qingshui, Taichung City, Taiwan)
- Other name: Huizhang

Religious life
- Religion: Buddhism
- Dharma name: Cheng Yen

Senior posting
- Teacher: Yin Shun
- Based in: Tzu Chi

Cheng Yen or Shih Cheng Yen (Chinese: 證嚴法師, 釋證嚴; pinyin: Zhèngyán Fǎshī; Wade–Giles: Chêng^{4} Yen^{2} Fa^{3}-shih^{1}; Pe̍h-ōe-jī: Chèng-giâm Hoat-su; (Note: Lit. "Master Cheng Yen") born Chin-Yun Wong; the 24th of the third Lunar month, 4 May 1937) is a Taiwanese Buddhist nun (bhikkhuni), teacher, and philanthropist. She is the founder of the Buddhist Compassion Relief Tzu Chi Foundation, ordinarily referred to as Tzu Chi, a Buddhist humanitarian organization based in Taiwan. In the West, she is sometimes referred to as the "Mother Teresa of Asia".

Cheng Yen was born in Taiwan during the Japanese occupation. She developed an interest in Buddhism as a young adult, ordaining as a Buddhist nun in 1963 under the well known proponent of humanistic Buddhism, master Yin Shun. After an encounter with a poor woman who had a miscarriage, and a conversation with Catholic nuns who talked about the various charity work of the Catholic Church, Cheng Yen founded the Tzu Chi Foundation in 1966 as a Buddhist humanitarian organization. The organization began as a group of thirty housewives who saved money for needy families. Tzu Chi gradually grew in popularity and expanded its services over time to include medical, environmental, and disaster relief work, eventually becoming one of the largest humanitarian organizations in the world, and the largest Buddhist organization in Taiwan.

Cheng Yen is considered to be one of the most influential figures in the development of modern Taiwanese Buddhism. In Taiwan, she is popularly referred to and is the last surviving of the "Four Heavenly Kings" of Taiwanese Buddhism, along with her contemporaries Sheng-yen of Dharma Drum Mountain, Hsing Yun of Fo Guang Shan and Wei Chueh of Chung Tai Shan.

== Early life ==
Cheng Yen was born "Chin-Yun Wong" (Chinese: 王錦雲; pinyin: Wáng Jǐnyún; Pe̍h-ōe-jī: Ông Kím-hûn) in 1937 in Kiyomizu Town, Taikō District, Taichū Prefecture, Japanese Taiwan (modern-day Qingshui, Taichung City, Taiwan). Unlike most of the other prominent Taiwanese Buddhist leaders, Cheng Yen was born in Taiwan rather than mainland China. Her uncle was childless, so she was given to be raised by her aunt and uncle. Cheng-Yen grew up during the Japanese occupation of Taiwan during World War II, where she witnessed the devastating effects of war and experienced the bombings in Taiwan. These experiences were credited as contributing to what she regarded as the truth behind the concept of impermanence. In 1945, when she was eight years old, she looked after her sick brother in a hospital for eight months, and so learned more closely about people's pain and helplessness. At the age of 21 in 1958, her father died suddenly from brain blood vessel disorder that brought about hemorrhaging and stroke. It was in searching for a burial place for him that Cheng Yen first came into close contact with the Buddhist Dharma, associated doctrines, and Buddhist scriptures (sutras). After her father's death, Cheng Yen took over managing her father's theaters and became financially responsible for her family.

=== Bhikṣuṇī ordination ===
Upon deciding to become a nun, Cheng Yen ran away to a temple in 1960, fearing that if she were to ask for permission in advance, she might not be permitted to go. After her first attempt at running away, her mother found her three days later and brought her back home. She ran away from home a second time in 1961 and travelled through eastern Taiwan with a friendly nun by the name of Xiūdào (修道法師; Pe̍h-ōe-jī: Siu-tō Hoat-su). Cheng Yen followed a non-traditional route to becoming a nun, traveling for two years with Xiūdào. Cheng Yen even shaved her own head before she had been officially ordained a nun. After traveling for two years, Cheng Yen decided that she needed to become an ordained nun in order to continue her lifestyle. She went to the Linji Huguo Chan Temple to register for ordination, but was turned down because she did not have a master. Typically, to become a nun in Taiwan, one must be the disciple of a master for two years before ordination. Cheng Yen encountered Yin Shun, whom she asked to be her mentor. He accepted her request, an hour before the registration closed. In February 1963, she became the disciple of her mentor, Yin Shun, who gave her the dharma name of Cheng Yen and the courtesy name of Huìzhāng (慧璋; Pe̍h-ōe-jī: Hūi-chiong). Yin Shun also gave her the expectation of working "for Buddha's teachings and for all sentient beings", which is written with six characters in Chinese. These six characters became the highest ideals for Cheng Yen in belief, teaching, and practice.

In May 1963, shortly after receiving her ordination as a nun, she went to Pu Ming Temple (普明寺; Pe̍h-ōe-jī: Phó͘-bêng-sī) in Hualien County to continue her spiritual formation. As a part of that formation, she recited the Lotus Sutra, which she revered, every day and transcribed every month. It was during her six months there that she vowed to commit herself to the Lotus Sutra and the "Path of the Bodhisattvas".

== Tzu Chi ==
=== Lotus Sutra ===
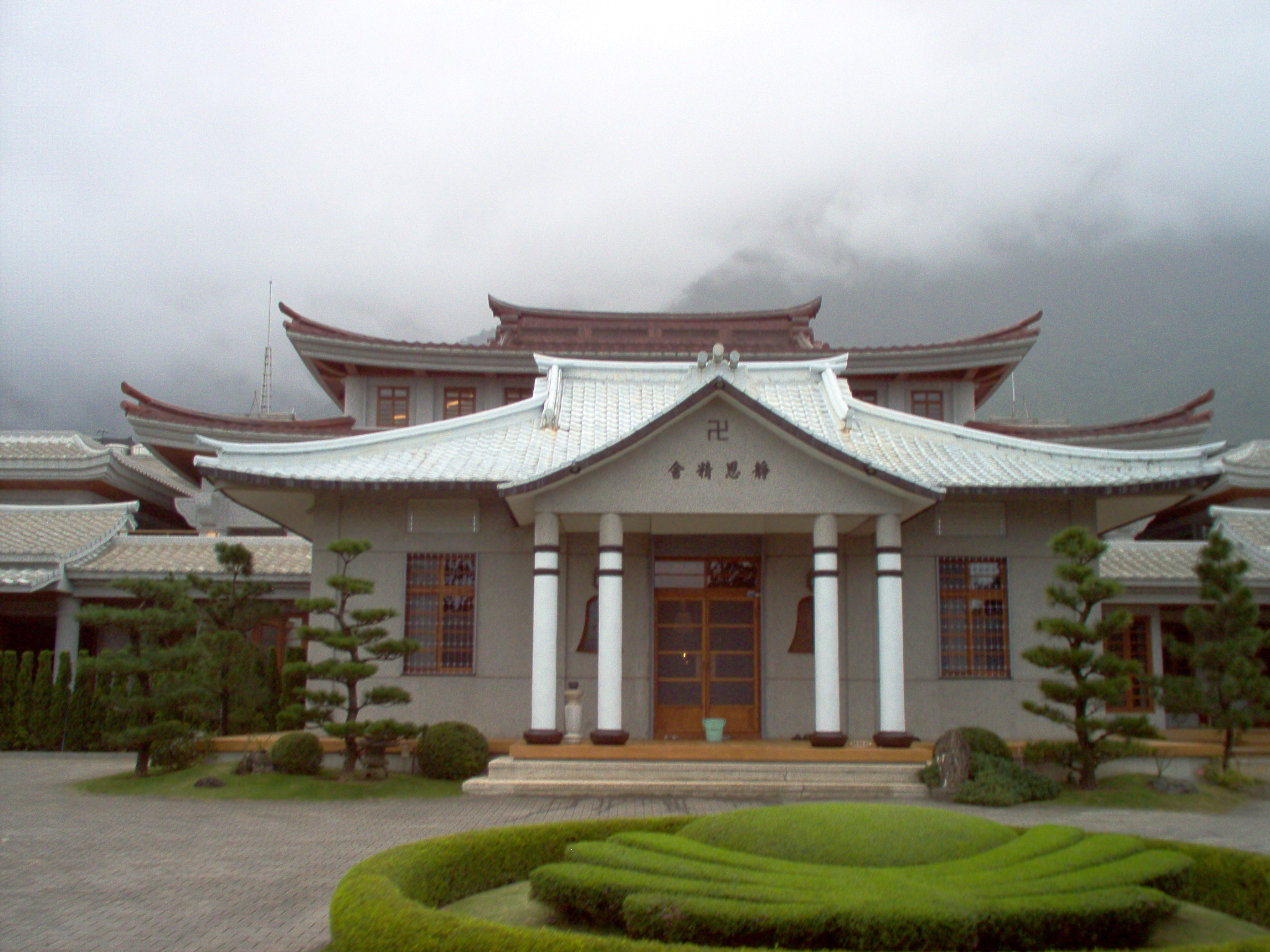
Jing Si Abode where Cheng Yen gives spiritual lessons to disciples

Cheng Yen was heavily influenced by the Lotus Sutra, which she called the culmination of the Buddha's teachings. Cheng Yen's initial exposure to the Lotus Sutra happened when she left her family in Fengyuan, Taichung County, and stayed away from the world by lodging in a small hut in Taitung County, in eastern Taiwan. While in Taitung, she accidentally found a Japanese version of the Lotus Sutra, and was pleased with what the book said. Later, she had a friend bring back a Japanese copy of the Lotus Sutra from Japan, and was inspired by the Muryōgi Kyō, or what is better known as the Innumerable Meanings Sutra, which is traditionally regarded as the prologue to the Lotus Sutra. The Innumerable Meanings Sutra addresses human problems, weather behavior, and psychiatric, psychological, and spiritual issues.

=== Miscarriage of Taiwanese aborigine ===
There were two watershed events that occurred in 1966 that are credited with having inspired Cheng Yen to found Tzu Chi. The first event occurred while Cheng Yen was visiting a hospital in Fenglin. After seeing blood on the hospital floor, she learned that a Taiwanese aborigine woman had a miscarriage. They were forced to carry the pregnant woman back up the mountain after they could not afford the 8,000 New Taiwan dollar deposit. The aborigine woman later died. This story actually became the source of a legal case in the early 2000s. While Cheng Yen never mentioned the name of the doctor when telling the story, one of her followers did, resulting in a defamation suit against Cheng Yen by the doctor's family.

=== Encounter with Roman Catholic nuns ===
The second event was a now-famous discussion Cheng Yen had with three Roman Catholic nuns at Pu Ming temple in 1966. While the nuns admitted the profundity of Buddhist teachings, they noted that the Catholic Church had helped people around the world by building schools and hospitals and inquired, "But what has Buddhism done for society?". The discussion is credited with having made Cheng Yen realize that Buddhism had to do more than simply encourage the private cultivation of people's souls.

=== Founding the Tzu Chi Foundation ===
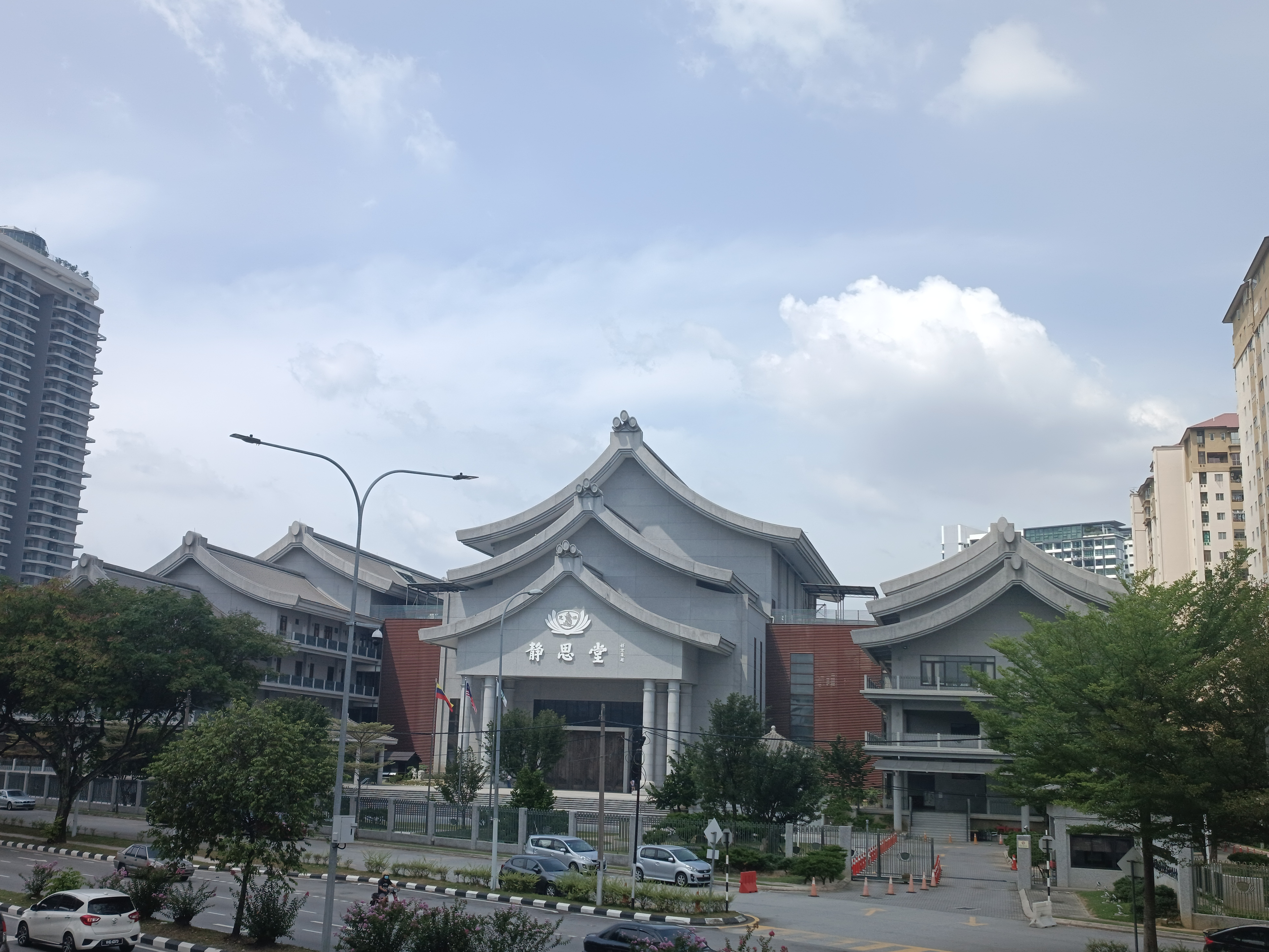
Main hall at Tzu Chi Foundation

Influenced by the Lotus Sutra, and the encounters with the Taiwanese aborigine woman and the Roman Catholic nuns, Cheng Yen established the Buddhist Compassion Relief Tzu Chi Foundation on 14 May 1966 in an endeavor to help the poor of east Taiwan. The organization started when Cheng Yen encouraged her followers, consisting of thirty housewives, to save fifty cents (US$0.02) from their grocery money every day and store them in bamboo savings banks to help needy families. When posed with the question, "Why can't we give once a week?", Cheng Yen replied, "Because giving is a practice and we need to give every day. If we have a yearning or a positive desire in us, we must nourish it and bring it to fulfillment. Just as Buddha was guided by a noble desire to help others, we too can listen to those who are sad or help those who are in pain." In the first year, fifteen families were provided with aid by the initial thirty followers.

Tzu Chi expanded its work from helping needy families to medical aid in 1970. In 1986 Tzu Chi established its first Hospital in Hualien. Tzu Chi has since built hospitals in Yuli, Hualien County; Dalin, Jiayi County; Guanshan, Taitung County; and Xindian, New Taipei City.

Tzu Chi experienced modest growth in the first two decades of its establishment, it grew to 293 members in 1968 and by 1986 had just 8,000 members. However, with the surge in popularity of Humanistic Buddhism in Taiwan in the late 1980s and 1990s, Tzu Chi enjoyed a rapid expansion in membership alongside several other major Taiwanese Buddhist organizations. From 1987 to 1991, Tzu Chi membership doubled in size each year, by 1994 Tzu Chi membership was estimated at 4 million members.

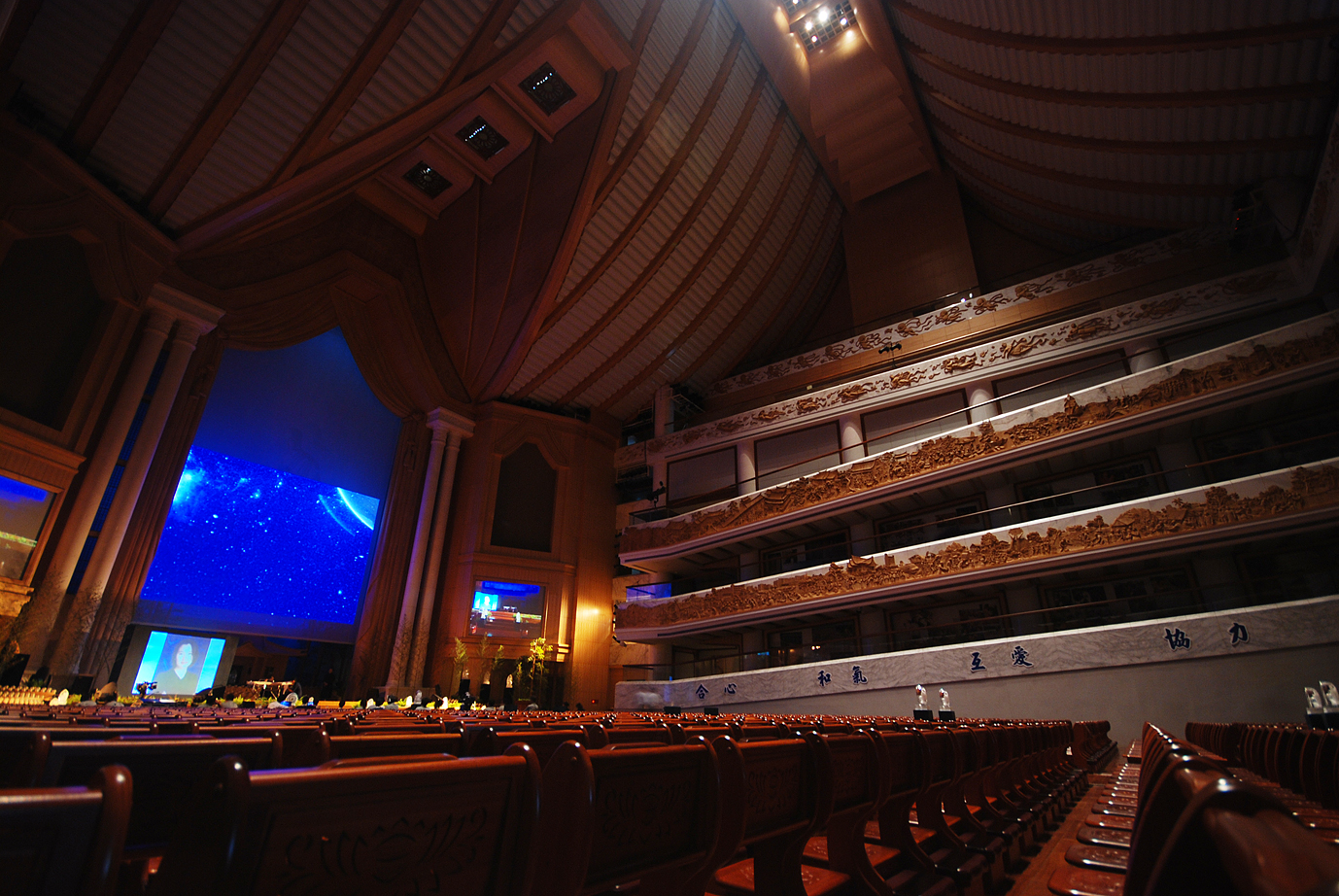
Interior of main hall of Tzu Chi Foundation

Tzu Chi is most well known for its work in disaster relief, Cheng Yen's philosophy includes the notion that not only are those receiving assistance benefiting materially by receiving the aid, but those delivering the aid are also spiritually rewarded when they see the gratitude in the eyes and smiles of the recipients. Tzu Chi's first major disaster relief effort was in 1991, when it undertook relief operations after severe floods hit central and eastern China. One of the most iconic attributes of Tzu Chi disaster relief efforts is that volunteers not only provide short term aid but also partake in long-term projects to rebuild the communities affected. Tzu Chi often builds new homes, schools, hospitals, and places of worship (including churches and mosques for non-Buddhists) for victims following a disaster. As of 2015, Tzu Chi has provided disaster relief aid to over 85 countries worldwide.

A significant fraction of funds raised by Tzu Chi revolves around environmentally friendly goals such as the encouragement of recycling and using reusable items to reduce waste. As of 2014, the foundation operates over 5,600 recycling stations.

Tzu Chi has grown to become a significant actor in civil society, Tzu Chi is not only the largest Buddhist organization in Taiwan, but also Taiwan's largest owner of private land. As of 2013, the organization was estimated to have approximately 10 million members worldwide, and chapters in 47 countries.

== Da Ai Television ==
In January 1998, Cheng Yen launched Da Ai (literally "Great Love") Satellite Television (慈濟大愛電視台; Chû-chè Tāi-ài Tiān-sī-tâi), a satellite television station. Da Ai is commercial free and operates twenty-four hours a day. It is funded by donations as well as partially by Tzu Chi's recycling programs. Da Ai features non-political news, lectures from Cheng Yen, and serial programs focused on the virtues, often profiling people who made major changes in their life for the better.

== Daily schedule ==
Cheng Yen makes a broadcast every morning in an address known as "Wisdom at Dawn" and makes another address in the evening. She wakes up around 3:45 am to start her activities, such as receiving visitors, and overseeing Tzu Chi's projects throughout Taiwan. She often makes monthly trips around the country to check in on Tzu Chi's projects and activities.

== Awards and recognition ==
- 1986: "Huashia Medal of the First Order" in Taiwan
- 1986: Good People and Good Deeds representative, Taiwan
- 1989: Social Service and Social Science Achievement Award from the Taiwanese-American Foundation, Taiwan & United States
- 1989: Social Service Award from the Wu San-Lian Foundation, Taiwan
- 1991: Ramon Magsaysay Award for Community Leadership in the Philippines
- 1991: Outstanding Leadership in Social Movement Award from the Social Movement Association, Taiwan
- 1991: Honorary Citizen & Honorary Mayor of St. Antonio & St. Antonio Honorary Territory Award, Texas, United States
- 1992: International Communication Award from the Government Information Office, Taiwan
- 1993: Honorary Doctorate Degree by the Chinese University of Hong Kong
- 1994: Eisenhower Medallion from the People to People International (PTPI Founded by U.S. President Dwight D. Eisenhower).
- 1995: Executive Yuan (Cabinet) Cultural Award, Taiwan
- 1995: 20 Outstanding Women in Asia from Asia Weekly magazine, Hong Kong
- 1996: Interior Ministry's First Class Honorary Award, Taiwan
- 1996: Foreign Affairs Medal of the First Order, Taiwan
- 1996: Huaguang Award of the First Order, Taiwan
- 1998: International Human Rights Award from the Unrepresented Nations and Peoples Organization (UNPO)
- 1998: Taiwan's 200 most influential people in 400 years, Common Wealth Magazine, Taiwan
- 1998: Outstanding Alumni Award on 100th anniversary of Chingshuei Elementary School, Taiwan
- 2000: Noel Foundation Life Award, United States
- 2000: Heros from Around the World, National Liberty Museum, Philadelphia, United States
- 2000: 50 Stars of Asia, Business Week magazine, United States
- 2001: Presidential Culture Award, Taiwan
- 2001: Selected as one of 26 "Heroes from Around the World" and featured on the "Wall of Honor" in Philadelphia's National Liberty Museum
- 2001: National Medal of the Second Order from the President of El Salvador
- 2001: Honorary Doctorate in Social Science from Hong Kong University
- 2002: Outstanding Women in Buddhism Award from World Buddhist University in Thailand
- 2002: Honorary Doctorate Degree in Socio-Cultural Studies from National Chiao Tung University in Taiwan
- 2003: Presidential Second Order of the Brilliant Star Award, Taiwan
- 2003: 3rd annual Top Ten Outstanding Educators Award from the Private School Culture and Education Association, Taiwan
- 2004: 2004 Asian American Heritage Award for Humanitarian Service by the Asian American Federation of California (AAFC).
- 2004: First annual special Lifetime Achievement Award in Volunteerism from the Daily Volunteer Association, Taiwan
- 2007: 24th Niwano Peace Prize for Humanitarian Service by The Niwano Peace Foundation in Japan. Recipient Page
- 2007: World Peace Prize from the American Los Angeles Chinese-American Elected Officials Organization, United States
- 2008: WFB Merit Medal from World Fellowship of Buddhists
- 2011: Honorary Degree of Doctor of Humanities from the University of the East, Manila, Philippines
- 2011: TIME 100 from TIME magazine, United States
- 2011: Franklin D. Roosevelt Distinguished Public Service Award from the Roosevelt Institute, United States
- 2011: “Master Cheng Yen Day” on October 11, 2011, City of Vancouver, Canada
- 2012: Commander of the Order of the Defender of State of Penang, Malaysia
- 2012: Honorary doctorate in social welfare from Mahachulalongkornrajavidyalaya University, Thailand
- 2014: Award of Honor from Rotary International
- 2014: A certificate of honor and appreciation presented by Prime Minister Laurent Lamothe, Haiti
- 2015: Honorary Doctorate in Social Development from Naresuan University, Thailand
- 2015: Honorary citizenship of Finale Emilia, Italy
- 2015: Contribution to Public Affairs award, You Bring Charm to the World Award Ceremony, China
- 2015: Personality of the Year Award, The Better Malaysia Foundation, Malaysia
- 2016: Invention Educational Medal, the 44th Geneva International Invention Exhibition, Switzerland
- 2016: Global Bhikkhuni Award from the Chinese Buddhist Bhikkhuni Association (CBBA) of Taiwan
- 2016: Sri Sathya Sai Award for Human Excellence in the category of Health from the Sri Sathya Sai Loka Seva Trust, India
- 2016: Honorary Member, Ukrainian Academy of Sciences, Ukraine
- 2016: Hall of Fame from Chinese Innovation and Invention Society, Taiwan
- 2018: Manhae Prize for Peace from the Society for the Promotion and Practice of Manhae's Thoughts, South Korea
- 2019: Honorary Doctorate in Humanities from National Chung Cheng University, Taiwan
- 2020: Certificate of appreciation and medal from Commissariat for Refugee and Migration, Serbia
- 2021: Ahmadiyya Muslim Peace Prize, United Kingdom
- 2021: Fellow, National Academy of Inventors, United States
- 2022: BBC 100 Women

== See also ==
- List of peace activists
- Humanitarianism
- Humanistic Buddhism
