= Seng Guan Temple =

Buddhist temple in Manila, Philippines

Coordinates: 14°36′28″N 120°58′29″E

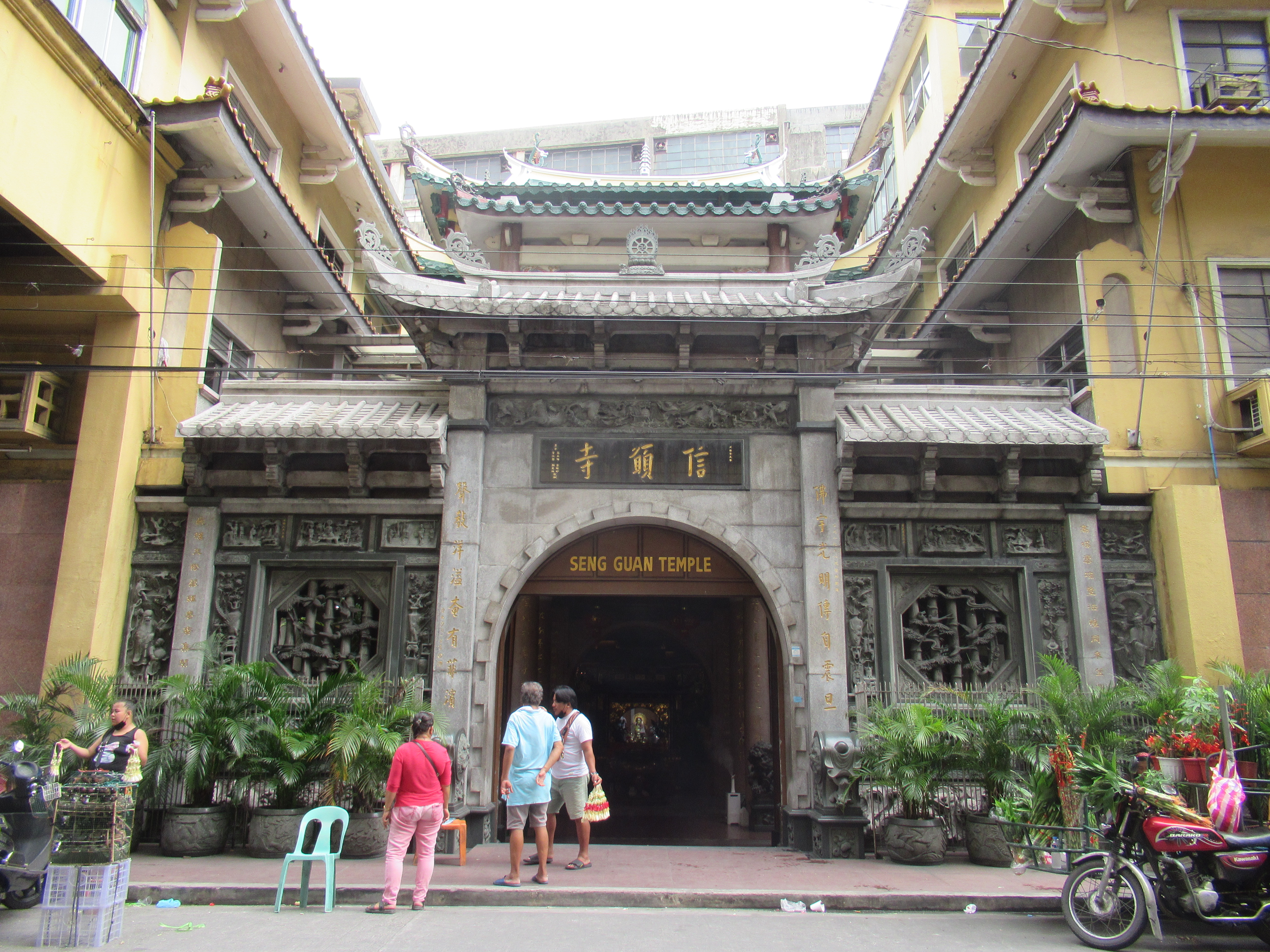

Religion
- Affiliation: Chan Buddhism
- Status: Active

Location
- Location: Narra St, Tondo, Manila, Philippines
- Country: Philippines
- Interactive map of Seng Guan Temple

Architecture
- Type: Buddhist Temple
- Founder: Venerable Seng Guan

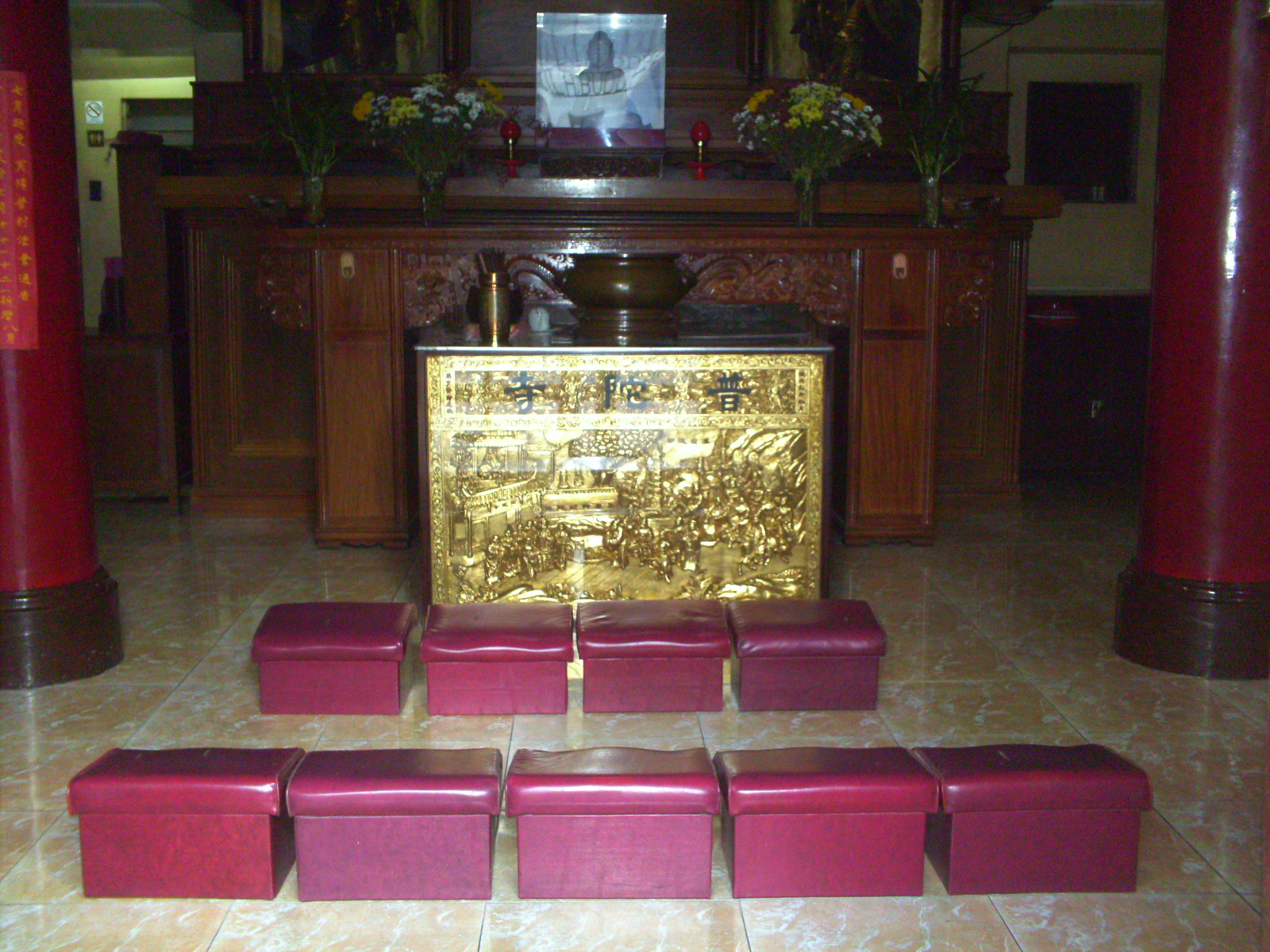
Seng Guan Temple Interior

Seng Guan Ssu (simplified Chinese: 信愿寺; traditional Chinese: 信願寺; Pe̍h-ōe-jī: Sìn-goān Sū / Sìn-goān Sī; pinyin: Xìnyuàn Sì) is a prominent Buddhist edifice on Narra Street, near Divisoria, in Tondo, Manila, Philippines. It contains a stupa, a huge repository for urns of human ashes, several meditation rooms, and various shrines. It is a major cultural center for the Chinese Filipino community. It is a Chan Buddhist temple built by the father of Buddhism in the Philippines, Master Seng Guan from the South Putuo Temple in Xiamen, Fujian Province.

== History ==
Seng Guan Ssu was established by Wu Jianglu, Wang Zhenwen, and members of their Chinese Buddhist Society in the Philippines. It is regarded as the first Buddhist temple in the Philippines, being the first temple with a resident monk, Venerable Seng Guan (Chinese: 性願師父; Pe̍h-ōe-jī: Sèng-goān Sai-hū; pinyin: Xìngyuàn Shīfu, 1889-1962) from Xiamen, after whom the temple was named. Seng Guan from Fu Kien (Fujian), China, was active in teaching and organizing work in Southern China, Manila, and Rizal. His work laid the foundations for several institutions, including the Samantabhadra Institute in Santa Cruz, Manila, and the Hwa Chong Buddhist Temple complex in Tugatog, Malabon, Rizal (now Malabon, Metro Manila), where his ashes are enshrined in a stupa.

In 1960, the Seng Guan Ssu and Philippine Chinese Charitable Association, Inc. set up the Philippine Academy of Sakya in Masangkay Street, Tondo, Manila. Over the years, Seng Guan Ssu also conducted many charity works for the poor, orphans, elderly, refugees, and government welfare projects.

== See also ==
- Buddhism in the Philippines
- Chinese Filipinos
- Lon Wa Buddhist Temple
