= Humanistic Buddhism =

Philosophy in Chinese Buddhism

Humanistic Buddhism (Chinese: 人間佛教; pinyin: rénjiān fójiào) is a modern philosophy practiced by Buddhist groups originating from Chinese Buddhism which places an emphasis on integrating Buddhist practices into everyday life and shifting the focus of ritual from the dead to the living, while honoring ancestors.

== Nomenclature ==
Taixu, a Buddhist modernist activist and thinker who advocated the reform and renewal of Chinese Buddhism, used the term "Buddhism for Human Life" (Chinese: 人生佛教; pinyin: rénshēng fójiào). The first two characters, "human" and "life", indicating his criticism of several aspects of late Qing dynasty and early Republican Chinese Buddhism that he wished to correct, namely, an emphasis on spirits and ghosts ("human") and funeral services and rites ("life"). His disciples continued this emphasis.

Taixu also used the term "Buddhism for the Human World", or popularly humanistic Buddhism (Chinese: 人間佛教; pinyin: rénjiān fójiào). It appears that at first the two terms were largely interchangeable. One of Taixu's disciples, Yin Shun, used the term "humanistic Buddhism" to indicate a criticism against the "deification" of Buddhism, which was another common feature of much of Chinese Buddhism, in his articles and books. It was Yin Shun and other disciples of Taixu who brought both of these two terms to Taiwan in the wake of the Nationalist government defeat during the Chinese Civil War by the Chinese Communist Party. It was in Taiwan that the term humanistic Buddhism became the most commonly used term, particularly amongst the religious leaders who originally hailed from China. It should not be confused with secular Buddhism.

== Background ==
Humanistic Buddhism integrates Buddhist practices into everyday life based on the nature of Sakyamuni Buddha achieving Buddhahood while bound in an earthly form. Humanistic Buddhism is based on six core concepts, namely humanism, altruism, spiritual practices as part of daily life, joyfulness, timeliness and the universality of saving all beings. From these principles, the aim of humanistic Buddhism is to reconnect Buddhist practice with the ordinary and places emphasis on caring for the material world, not solely concerned with achieving delivery from it.

== Soka Gakkai definition ==
According to Daisaku Ikeda, head of the Soka Gakkai new religious movement:

The essence of Buddhist humanism lies in the insistence that human beings exercise their spiritual capacities to the limit, or more accurately, without limit, coupled with an unshakable belief in their ability to do this. In this way, faith in humanity is absolutely central to Buddhism.

Another aspect of manifesting the teaching of Humanistic Buddhism is the interfaith dialogue and the study of the common tenets of non-violence.

Soka Gakkai International teaches that "the Lotus Sutra ... leads all people to Buddhahood and we ordinary human beings are in no way different or separate from one another" and viewed the Buddha as a role model for all humanity: "The purpose of the appearance in this world of Shakyamuni Buddha, the lord of teachings, lies in his behaviour as a human being".

== Buddhism and new religious movements in Taiwan ==
Yin Shun was the key figure in the doctrinal exposition of Buddhism and thus humanistic Buddhism in Taiwan. However, he was not particularly active in the social or political spheres of life. This was to be carried out by a younger generation such as Hsing Yun, Sheng-yen, Wei Chueh and Cheng Yen. These four figures, collectively known as the Four Heavenly Kings of Taiwanese Buddhism, head the Four Great Mountains, or monasteries, of Taiwanese Buddhism and Buddhist new religious movements, namely Fo Guang Shan, Dharma Drum Mountain, Chung Tai Shan and Tzu Chi.

== History of Chinese Buddhist ritual practice ==
Humanistic Buddhism originated in China at the beginning of the 20th century. The movement emerged as a collective attempt to emphasize the importance of serving the living in Buddhist practice, rather than placing focus on the traditional Buddhist rituals for the dead. After the Ming dynasty, penance for the dead had become more widespread, replacing rituals focused on meditation. A possible cause for this was Emperor Zhu Yuanzhan's Buddhist Orders issued in 1391. These created three categories of the sangha, or monastic class: meditation monks, teaching monks and yoga monks. These yoga monks were responsible for performing rituals for the dead. This led to certain monks taking on the roles of monks on call who performed rituals to earn their livelihood. These monks on call made up a majority of the sangha by the end of the Qing dynasty. Another possible cause of the increased rituals for the dead was the spread of tantric Buddhism following the Yuan dynasty which promoted ritual practice.

== Fo Guang Shan ==
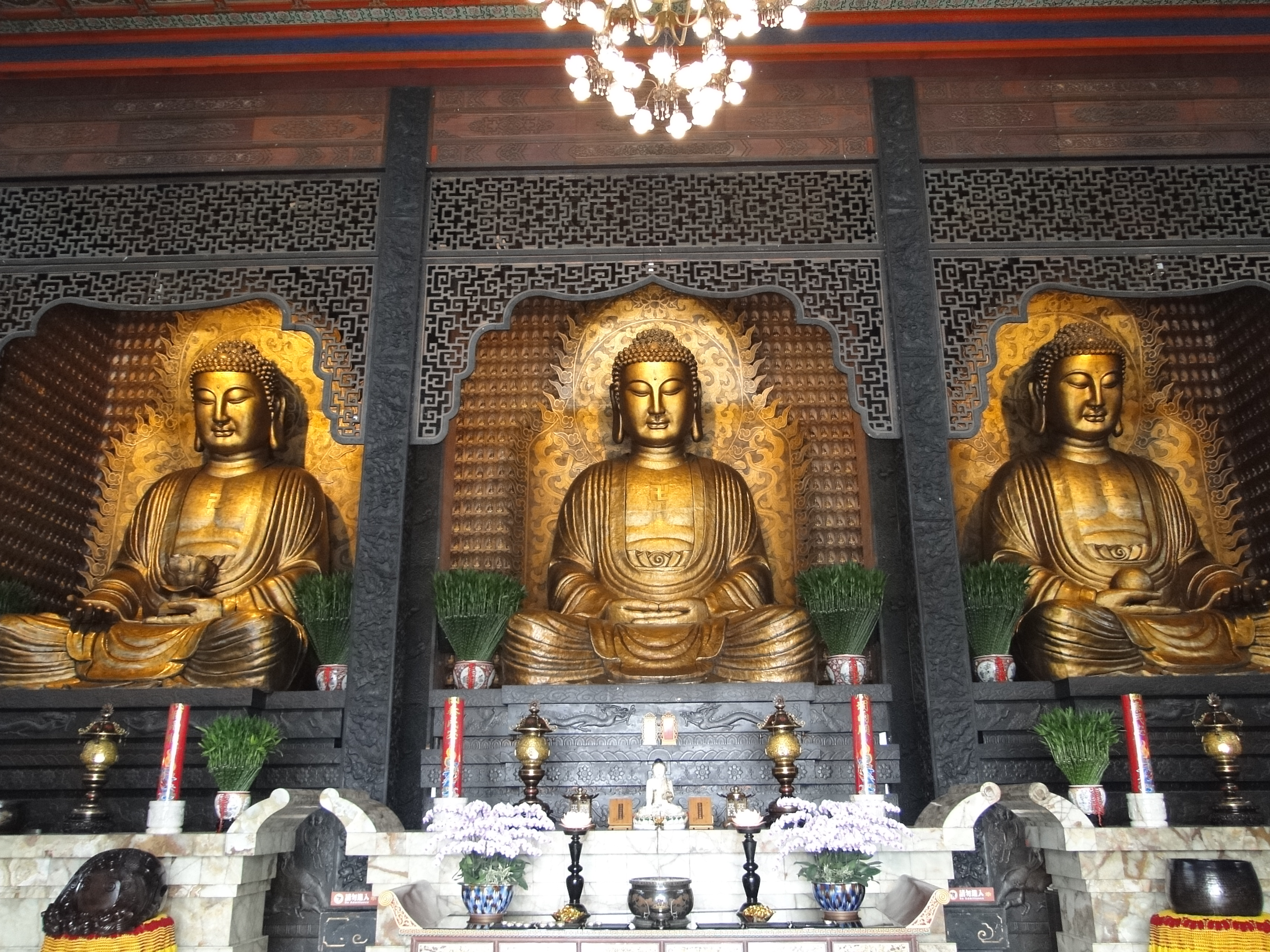
Main shrine from the Fo Guang Shan Monastery, Fo Guang Shan, a Humanistic Buddhist organization

Fo Guang Shan is one of the most popular humanistic Buddhist organizations in present-day Taiwan. They have done work to reform and re-invent more traditional ritual practices. They strive to highlight Dharmic aspects of ritual and tailor their practices and worship to benefit the living, rather than the dead. Fo Guang Shan are known for their Recitation Teams, which they send to hospitals and hospice care facilities to assist the dying and their loved ones in performing humanistic Buddhist ritual practice. Humanistic Buddhists believe that death is not an end so much as the beginning of a new life and therefore rituals at the end of life should comfort and pacify the dying individual. They also hold ceremonies that celebrate marriage and the happiness of married couples which are popular worldwide.

=== Hsing Yun ===
Hsing Yun (1927–2023) was widely considered a contemporary leader in the humanistic Buddhist movement in Taiwan and was the founder of Fo Guang Shan in the 1960s. He wrote Rites for Funerals, a work outlining the Dharmic elements of these rituals and reforming them to place emphasis on the living participants and worshipers. He also wrote The Etiquettes and Rules, which outlines the practices of traditional Buddhism from a humanistic perspective.

== Gender equality in humanistic Buddhism ==
One controversy of humanistic Buddhism is the role of women in society. Hsing Yun held a conservative perspective as to the position of women and published a variety of articles for men on how to maintain a functioning household and for women on how to provide proper companionship and please their husbands. Despite this perception, women have earned themselves a solid position in the Chinese workforce. While Hsing Yun did not advocate for women being forced out of workplaces, he cautioned men about the problems that might arise in a household if a woman is not at home to keep things in order. However, Buddhist nuns have been gaining a place as of 1998 in which 136 women from a variety of Buddhist traditions were ordained into the Fo Guang Shan tradition in China. Taiwan has also had ordination available to Buddhist nuns for centuries.

== See also ==
- Hsing Yun – Taiwanese Buddhist monk (1927–2023)
- Fo Guang Shan – Worldwide Buddhist community founded by Hsing Yun
- Nan Tien Temple – Buddhist temple in Australia
- Religious humanism – Integration of humanist ethical philosophy
