= Yin Shun =

Chinese Buddhist monk and scholar (1906–2005)

Yin Shun 印順
- Title: Venerable Mentor (導師)

Personal life
- Born: Zhang Luqin; 5 April 1906 Zhejiang Province, Qing Dynasty
- Died: 4 June 2005 (aged 99) Hualien County, Republic of China
- Other name: Sheng Zheng（盛正）

Religious life
- Religion: Mahayana Buddhism

Senior posting
- Teacher: Taixu (太虛), Qingnian (清念)

Yin Shun (印順, Yìnshùn; 5 April 1906 – 4 June 2005) was a Chinese Buddhist monk and Madhyamaka scholar. Though he was particularly trained in the Three Treatise school, he was an advocate of the One Vehicle (or Ekayana) as the ultimate and universal perspective of Buddhahood for all, and as such included all schools of Buddha Dharma, including the Five Vehicles and the Three Vehicles, within the meaning of the Mahayana as the One Vehicle. Yin Shun's research helped bring forth the ideal of "Humanistic" (human-realm) Buddhism, a leading mainstream Buddhist philosophy studied and upheld by many practitioners. His work also regenerated the interests in the long-ignored Āgamas among Chinese Buddhist society and his ideas are echoed by the American Theravadin teacher Bhikkhu Bodhi. As a contemporary master, he was most popularly known as the mentor of Cheng Yen, the founder of Buddhist Tzu Chi Charity Foundation, as well as the teacher to several other prominent monastics.

Although Yin Shun is closely associated with the Tzu Chi Foundation, he has had a decisive influence on others of the new generation of Buddhist monks such as Sheng-yen of Dharma Drum Mountain and Hsing Yun of Fo Guang Shan, who were active in humanitarian aid, social work, environmentalism and academic research as well. He is considered to be one of the most influential figures of Taiwanese Buddhism, having influenced many of the leading Buddhist figures in modern Taiwan.

== Biography ==
Yin Shun was born on 5 April 1906 (The traditional Chinese calendar: 12 March 丙午) in a village in Zhejiang Province, China. His birth name was Zhang Luqin (Wade–Giles: Chang Luch'in). At the time of Zhang's birth, it was the end of the Qing Dynasty. Eleven days after his birth, Zhang was critically ill and nearly died. He began school at age seven.

In his studies, he stumbled upon the subject of immortality—a subject that Zhang found interesting. His parents found what Zhang was doing to be very unusual, so they required him to teach at other schools.

Zhang turned his attention to Confucianism and Taoism, but neither of these philosophies satisfied his spiritual yearning. At one point, Christianity aroused his interest but Zhang realised the irrelevance in their doctrine and after two years could not commit himself to Christianity. One day, Zhang was looking for something to read. He stumbled onto the words "the Buddha Dharma". This immediately sparked spiritual interest in his heart, and Zhang zealously looked for anything that had to do with Buddhism.

== Becoming a monastic ==
=== Searching for the Dharma ===
In 1930, Zhang applied to a Buddhist college in Beijing. For many days he had travelled from his home to Beijing, with high hopes. He arrived too late for acceptance.

While pondering where he could go next, Zhang thought of a temple called "Tiantong Temple". Zhang then went to Mount Putuo, where he met a young man named Wang. Both searched for an abode where they could study the Buddha Dharma. They eventually found a small place where they could do so, where their abbot who was well-cultivated. They asked to study under him.

The elder monk then referred Zhang and Wang to another place called Fuzhun Monastery (福泉庵), less than a half mile from where they were. The two hurried to Fuzhun Monastery. Later, on 11 October 1930, the abbot, Master Qingnian (清念和尚), shaved Zhang Luqin's head and gave him the Dharma name of Yin Shun (印順).

== Achievements ==
In March 2004, he was awarded the Order of Propitious Clouds Second Class, for his contributions to the revitalization of Buddhism in Taiwan.

== Encounter with Master Cheng Yen ==
In February 1963, a thirty-two-day novitiate for Buddhist monks and nuns was held in Taipei. Monks and nuns came from all over Taiwan to register. All were accepted except a young female devotee from Hualien, a county in eastern Taiwan.

Master Yin Shun recalled the day he first met Master Cheng Yen:

Huiyin, a student of mine, brought her to the Hui Ri Lecture Hall, where I lived, to purchase The Complete Teachings of Master Taixu. Huiyin told me that the woman had been rejected from the novitiate because she had shaved her own head and her teacher was a layman. Someone said she could have just asked any of the monks or nuns present to accept her as a disciple, but she claimed that she needed to seek her master carefully. After she bought the book, there was a heavy rain shower and she couldn't leave. She then begged Huiyin to tell me that she wished to become my disciple. She had no idea that I rarely accept disciples¹. As if the heavens had heard her wish, I happened to walk out of my room just then. Huiyin came toward me and told me what was going on. I couldn't figure out why she chose me as her master, but I consented.

¹At the time, Yin Shun only had three disciples. All three now are teaching the Buddha Dharma in the United States.

Master Yin Shun then said to her, "Our karmic relationship is very special. As a nun, you must always be committed to Buddhism and to all living beings."

Since the registration for the novitiate was about to end within the hour, the venerable master quickly gave the young disciple her Buddhist name, Cheng Yen, and told her to get going and begin the novitiate promptly. At that moment, the conditions for the creation of the Tzu Chi Foundation began.

In the summer of 1979, Master Yin Shun came to Hualien. Living in this beautiful but undeveloped part of the island, Cheng Yen told Master Yin Shun about her aspiration to build a high-quality hospital for the people living in eastern Taiwan, where there were few medical facilities.

As he listened to her, he could foresee the daunting challenges lying ahead. Like a father sharing his life experiences with his daughter, he said, "Just like the time you told me you intended to begin charity work, I reminded you to think whether you would have the strength and the money when more people came to you for help. The task can only be realized with unwavering commitment."

With this talk, the hospital construction project began.

== Death and funeral ==
On 4 June 2005, Yin Shun died after suffering from complications pulmonary tuberculosis since 1954. He died in Hualien Tzu Chi Hospital at the age of 99. Tzu Chi, along with other Buddhist organizations and monasteries influenced by Yin Shun, joined in mourning for eight days, the length of his funeral.

Among those attending the services were Taiwanese President Chen Shui-bian, ROC Premier Frank Hsieh, and other legislators. Several monastics from many parts of the world, predominantly the United States, also attended Yin Shun's funeral. Monastics who were disciples of Yin Shun also attended the funeral, including Cheng Yen, who led the Tzu Chi delegation.

Yin Shun had a simple and spartan lifestyle in the last days of his life, so his disciples decided to keep his funeral simple but solemn. His funeral was held at Fu Yan Vihara in Hsinchu, where he had lived for many years until his death. Yin Shun was later cremated on 10 June and his ashes and portrait were placed inside a hall alongside the remains of other monastic alumni of Fu Yan.

== Works ==
- The Way To Buddhahood: Instructions From A Modern Chinese Master, Boston: Wisdom Books, 1998
- "Selected Translations of Miao Yun" (PDF). Archived from the original on 28 May 2014., Buddha Dharma Education Association 1995. This a translation of selections of Sublime Clouds Collection 《妙雲集》, a major collection of Yin Shun's writings.
- A Sixty-Year Spiritual Voyage on the Ocean of Dharma, Noble Path Buddhist Education Fellowship, 2009. Translation of Yun Shun's autobiography 《游心法海六十年》 by Yu-Jung L. Avis, Po-Hui Chang, and Maxwell E. Siegel.
- An Investigation into Emptiness: Parts One and Two, Towaco, NJ: Noble Path Buddhist Education Fellowship Incorporated, 2017. Translation of 《空之探究》 by Shi Hui Feng.
- Over 50 works in Chinese Mandarin, on a range of issues, covering many thousands of pages. These are presently in the process of translation into English.

== Bibliography ==
- Bingenheimer, Marcus (2004), Der Mönchsgelehrte Yinshun (*1906) und seine Bedeutung für den Chinesisch-Taiwanischen Buddhismus im 20. Jahrhundert. [The Scholar Monk Yinshun 印順 – His Relevance for the Development of Chinese and Taiwanese Buddhism.] (PDF), Heidelberg: Edition Forum (Würzburger Sinologische Schriften), ISBN 3-927943-26-6, archived from the original on 23 June 2014
- Bingenheimer, Marcus (2007)."Some Remarks on the Usage of Renjian Fojiao 人間佛教 and the Contribution of Venerable Yinshun to Chinese Buddhist Modernism" (PDF). Archived from the original on 23 June 2014. In: Development and Practice of Humanitarian Buddhism: Interdisciplinary Perspectives. Mutsu Hsu, Jinhua Chen, and Lori Meeks (Eds.). Hua-lien (Taiwan): Tzuchi University Press, pp. 141–161.
- Bingenheimer, Marcus (2009)."Writing History of Buddhist Thought in the Twentieth Century: Yinshun (1906–2005) in the Context of Chinese Buddhist Historiography". Archived from the original on 30 May 2013. Journal of Global Buddhism Vol.10, pp. 255–290. ISSN 1527-6457.
- Hurley, Scott (2001). A study of Master Yinshun's hermeneutics: An interpretation of the tathagatagarbha doctrine, PhD Thesis, University of Arizona
- Hurley, Scott (2004)., Contemporary Buddhism 5 (1), 29–46
- Pan, Shuen (2002). The Story of Dharma Master Yin Shun. Tzu Chi Quarterly Summer 2002: Translated by Teresa Chang and Adrian Yiu.
- Travagnin, Stefania (2004). Master Yinshun and the Pure Land Thought: A Doctrinal Gap Between Indian Buddhism and Chinese Buddhism. Acta Orientalia Academiae Scientiarum Hungaricae 57 (3), 271–328
