= Buddha's Light International Association – Philippines =

The logo of BLIA Philippines

The Buddha's Light International Association – Philippines (Chinese: 國際佛光會菲律賓協會) is the Philippine chapter of Buddha's Light International Association and is composed of the following chapters:

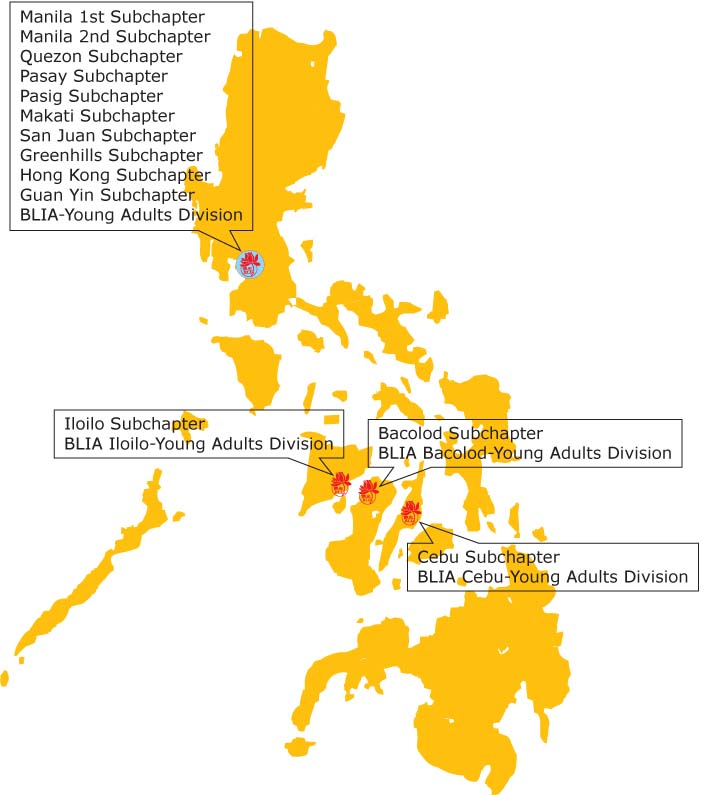
Map of the Philippines with locations of the different Chapters of BLIA Philippines

Logo	Chapter	Chinese
	Manila 1 Subchapter	馬尼拉第一分會
	Manila 2 Subchapter	馬尼拉第二分會
	Quezon Subchapter	計順分會
	Pasay Subchapter	巴西分會
	Pasig Subchapter	巴石分會
	Makati Subchapter	馬加智分會
	San Juan Subchapter	仙範分會
	Greenhills Subchapter	青山分會
	Hong Kong Subchapter	香江分會
	Guan Yin Subchapter	觀音分會
	BLIA-Young Adults Division	佛光青年分會
	Cebu Subchapter	宿務分會
	BLIA Cebu-Young Adults Division	佛光宿務青年分會
	Bacolod Subchapter	描戈律分會
	BLIA Bacolod-Young Adults Division	佛光描戈律青年分會
	Iloilo Subchapter	怡朗分會
	BLIA Iloilo-Young Adults Division	佛光怡朗青年分會
