= Chung Tai Shan =

Chan Buddhist monastic order

- 中台山
- Established: 1987
- Founder: Wei Chueh
- Type: Buddhist Monastic Order
- Headquarters: Chung Tai Chan Monastery
- Location: Puli, Nantou County, Taiwan
- Website: www.ctworld.org.tw/english-96/html/

Chung Tai Shan
- Traditional Chinese: 中台山
- Literal meaning: Inner Tai Mountain
Transcriptions
Standard Mandarin
- Hanyu Pinyin: Zhōng tái shān
Southern Min
- Hokkien POJ: Tiong-tai-san

Chung Tai Shan (Chinese: 中台山; pinyin: Zhōng tái shān; Pe̍h-ōe-jī: Tiong-tai-san) is a Taiwan-based international Chan Buddhist monastic order founded by Wei Chueh in 1987. The monastery headquarters, Chung Tai Chan Monastery (or Chung Tai Chan Buddhist Temple, 中台禪寺), completed in September 2001, is located in Puli, Nantou County, in central Taiwan. It is the tallest and one of the largest monasteries in both Taiwan and the world, having a height of 136 metres (446 ft). Widely admired as an architectural masterpiece because of the mountain monastery's more modern look, the temple is second only to Fo Guang Shan's monastery in physical size and in the number of ordained disciples.

The temple follows traditional Chinese Chan teaching, emphasizing sudden enlightenment and gradual cultivation.

== Branches ==
Chung Tai Chan Monastery has established more than 90 meditation centers and branches in Taiwan and abroad, including branches in Australia, Hong Kong, Japan, Philippines, and Thailand.

=== United States ===
Nine Branches of Chung Tai Shan are in the United States

- Chung Tai Zen Center of Sunnyvale, CA
- Buddha Gate Monastery in Lafayette in the East Bay, CA
- Middle Land Chan Monastery in Pomona, CA
- Great Dharma Chan Monastery in Boulder, CO
- Chung Tai Zen Center of Houston, TX
- Chung Tai International Retreat Center in Shepherd, TX
- Buddha Mind Monastery in Oklahoma City, OK
- Buddha Jewel Monastery in Seattle, WA
- Dharma Jewel Monastery in Atlanta, GA

=== Europe ===
- Hua Yi Si (Monastero Hua Yi) in Rome, Italy

=== Asia ===
- Pudong Chan Monastery in Osaka, Japan
- Ocean Sky Chan Monastery in the Manila, Philippines
- PuGuang Meditation Center in Hong Kong
- Great Buddha Monastery in Bangkok, Thailand

=== Australia ===
- Bao Lin Chan Monastery in Melbourne, VIC

== See also ==
- Buddhism in Taiwan
- Four Great Mountains (Taiwan)
- Four Heavenly Kings (Taiwan)
- Chinese Buddhism
- Chan Buddhism
