= Lon Wa Buddhist Temple =

Buddhist temple in Davao City, Philippines

- 龍華寺
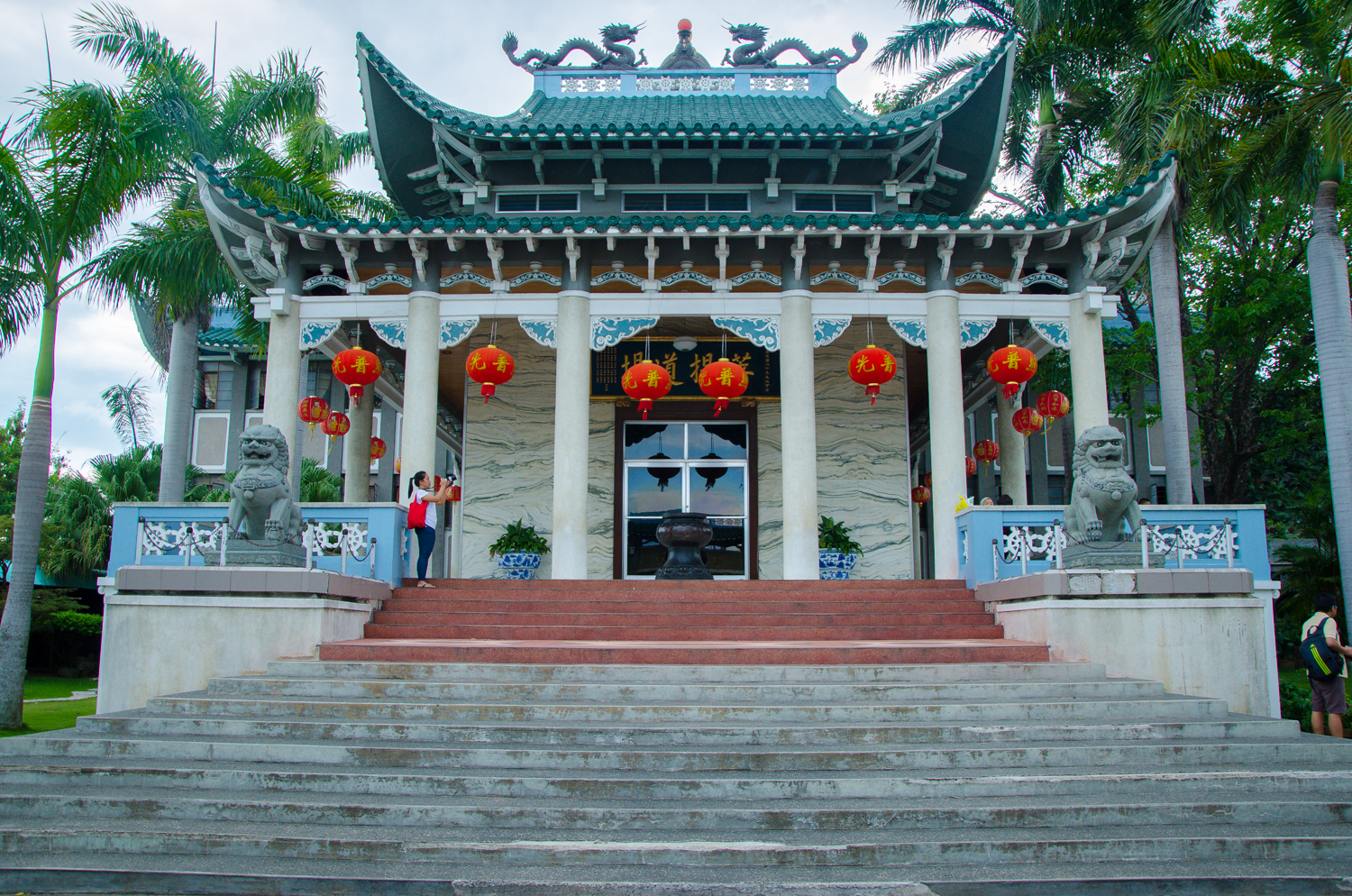

Religion
- Affiliation: Buddhism

Location
- Location: Davao City
- Country: Philippines
- Interactive map of Lon Wa Buddhist Temple
- Coordinates: 7°05′44″N 125°37′15″E

The Longhua Temple, also known as the Lon Wa Buddhist Temple, is one of the biggest Buddhist temples in the Philippines and the biggest in the island of Mindanao. It is located in the Agdao District, 3-4 kilometers northeast of the center of Davao City at Cabagiuo Avenue.

The Lon Wa Buddhist Temple walls though are laden with Italian marble slab. The temple host a gold Kuan Yin, wood carvings featuring the life of Buddha, and lily ponds.
