= Ocean Sky Chan Monastery =

Buddhist monastery in Metro Manila, Philippines

Coordinates: 14°35′53″N 121°02′17″E

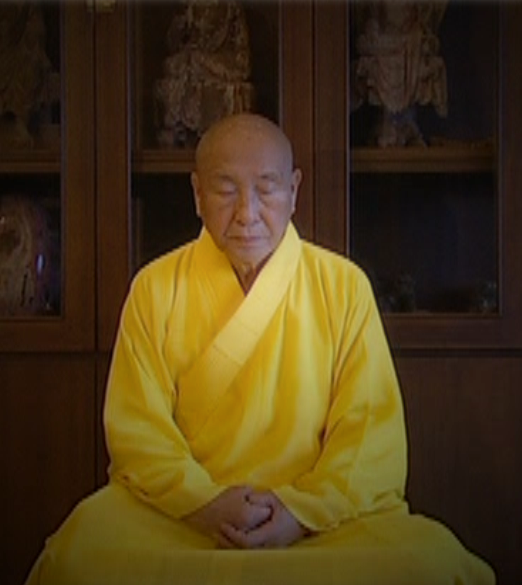
Grandmaster Wei Chueh

Ocean Sky Chan Monastery (Chinese: 海天禪寺) is the Manila, Philippine branch of Taiwan's Chung Tai Chan Monastery (中台禪寺). Completed in 2001, the monastery offers free Zen meditation classes and other services, under the direction of Chung Tai and Grand Master Wei Chueh.

The monastery follows traditional Chinese Ch'an, emphasizing on teachings based on sudden enlightenment and gradual cultivation.

The monastery's current Abbess is Ven. Jian Shu (見樞法師).

== Location and history ==
Ocean Sky is located in Barangay Little Baguio, San Juan City, near the Greenhills district. The five-storey building, built to be spacious, bright and elegant, has a meditation hall and auditorium to accommodate hundreds of people doing Chan meditation, or for listening to Buddhist scripture. Since its inception, it has offered meditation classes in Chinese and English; Buddhist chanting classes, children's summer programs and summer camps, meditation retreats and other activities, hoping to inspire Buddhist virtues in all.

The resident female monastics all graduated from the Taiwan Institute of Buddhist Studies; their goal is to the spread compassion. The "Four Tenets of Chung Tai" serve as the basis of the monastery's teaching method, aiming for purification of the human mind, and the realization of life's true value and meaning.

The Four Tenets of Chung Tai (中台四箴行──敬、慈、和、真):

To Elders be Respectful; To Juniors be Kind; With All Humanity be Harmonious; In all Endeavours be True.

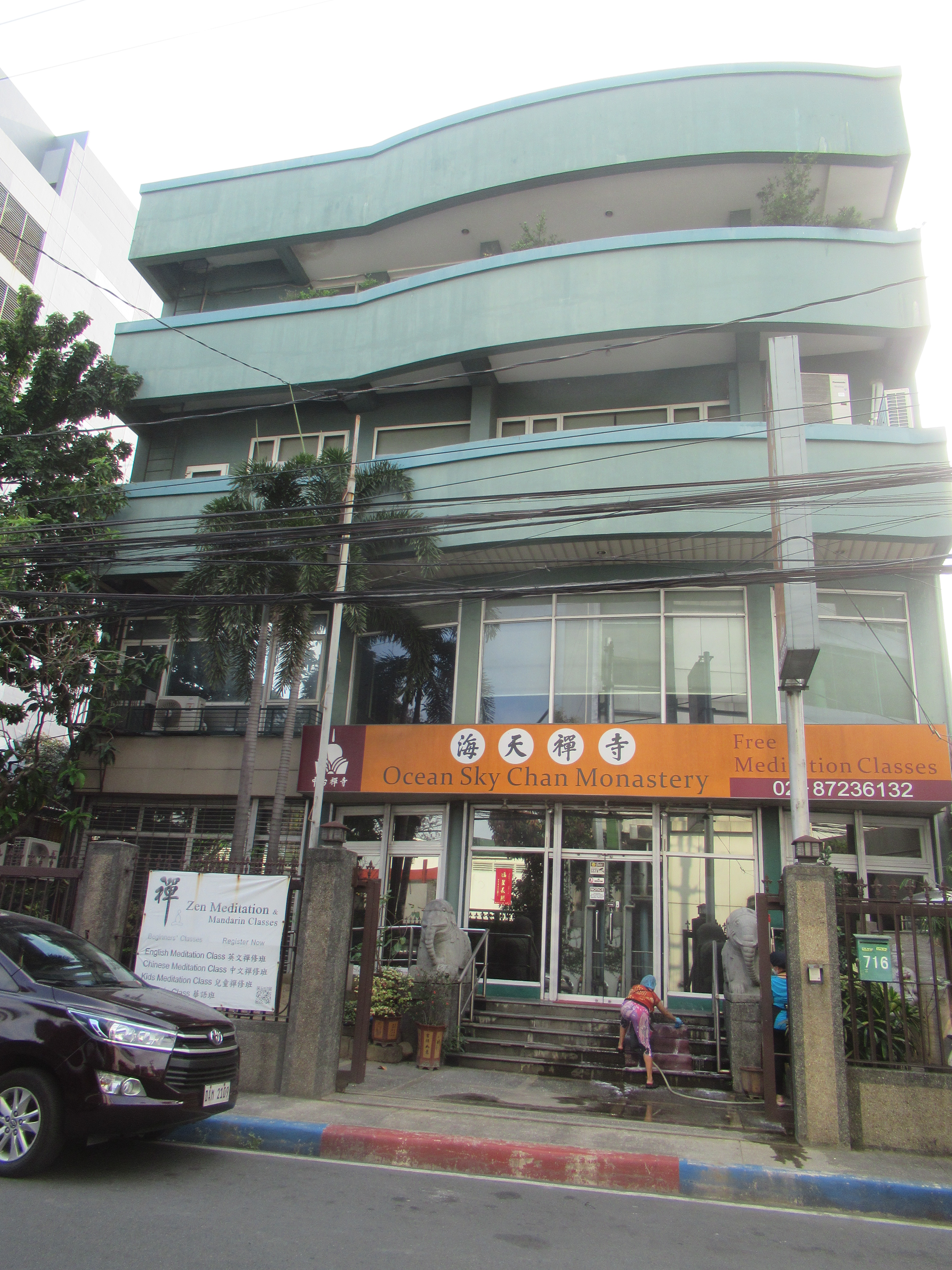
Façade of the monastery

== Services ==
A Buddhist monastery in the Philippines dedicated to the Linji (Rinzai) school of Chan (Zen), Ocean Sky regularly holds classes on Zen and the fundamentals of Buddhism. The monastery has regular Dharma services (Sutra recitation, Chan meditation, etc.) with English translations. All services and activities conducted in both English and Chinese.

Services include:

- Medicine Buddha Ceremony
- Meditation Class, Mandarin Class, Qigong, Buddhist Chanting (Saturdays and Sundays)
- Grand Offering to the Buddha and Diamond Sutra Recitation (every 1st and 15th of the Lunar month)
- Thousand Buddhas Repentance
- Various Dharma Ceremonies (every month and Buddhist holidays)

All classes and services are free of charge, and vegetarian meals are served.
