= Wei Chueh =

Chinese Bhikshu (1928–2016)

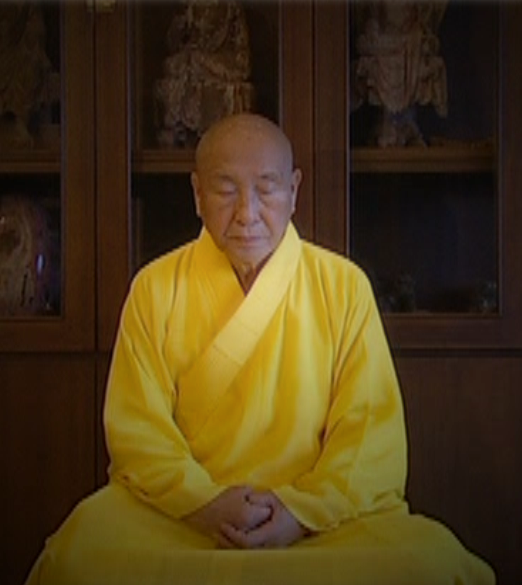
- Title: Venerable Master or Grand Master

Personal life
- Born: 1928 Yingshan County, Sichuan, Sichuan, China
- Died: 8 April 2016 (aged 87–88) Puli, Nantou, Taiwan

Religious life
- Religion: Chan Buddhism
- Lineage: Linji school

Senior posting
- Based in: Taiwan

Wei Chueh (Chinese: 惟覺法師; pinyin: Wéijué, 1928 – 8 April 2016) was a Chinese Bhikshu (Buddhist monk) from Taiwan. He is the founder of the Chung Tai Shan monastery and Buddhist order. Wei Chueh is often credited for reviving the traditional teachings of Chan Buddhism.

Wei Chueh was born in 1928 in Yingshan County, Sichuan. In 1963, he was ordained under Lin Yuan at the Shi Fan Da Jue (“Great Enlightenment”) Chan Monastery in Keelung, Taiwan. He was fully ordained as a monk in 1967 at Daijue Temple in Keelung. He offered many retreats in Yilan, Hsinchu, and Hong Kong before settling into solitary seclusion at Yangmingshan near Wanli District, New Taipei. He lived under extremely poor and primitive conditions, but continued to practice the Dharma. In 1987, he founded Lin Quan Temple in Taipei County. Wei Chueh became known for organizing seven-day Zen retreats and dharma assemblies, as well as his "lively and flexible" preaching style. As his popularity increased, his temple was unable to fit more people.

Due to the continuing growth of both lay and monastic disciples, he planned to build a larger monastery in Puli in Central Taiwan. The Chung Tai Chan Monastery was inaugurated in September 2001.

Wei was one of eight venerables who proposed the World Buddhist Forum in China in 2004, a suggestion that won support from Buddhist circles in countries like Japan and South Korea.

In 2005, the Grand Master appointed his disciple Jian Deng to be the abbot of Chung Tai.

Wei died at the age of 88 on 8 April 2016.
