= Chung Tai Chan Monastery =

Buddhist monastery in Taiwan

- 中台禪寺
- Interactive map of Chung Tai Chan Monastery

Monastery information
- Order: Chung Tai Shan
- Established: 2001
- Controlled churches: Linji school

People
- Founder: Grand Master Weichueh
- Abbot: Master Jianying

Architecture
- Status: Active
- Architect: C. Y. Lee
- Style: Monastery
- Groundbreaking: 1990
- Completed date: 2001
- Construction cost: US$650 million

Site
- Location: Puli, Nantou County, Taiwan
- Coordinates: 24°00′32.9″N 120°56′40.5″E
- Website: https://www.ctworld.org.tw/english-96/html/

Chung Tai Chan Monastery (Chinese: 中台禪寺; pinyin: Zhōngtáichán Sì) is a Buddhist monastery located in Puli Township, Nantou County, Taiwan. It is the headquarters of Chung Tai Shan, an international Chan Buddhist order. It is the tallest and one of the largest monasteries in both Taiwan and the world, having a height of 136 metres (446 ft). Widely admired as an architectural masterpiece because of the mountain monastery's more modern look, the temple is second only to Fo Guang Shan's monastery in physical size and in the number of ordained disciples.

== History ==
Construction began in 1990 and ended with completion in 2001. From 2001 until 2006 it was the world's tallest Buddhist building and has been the world's tallest Buddhist temple since 2001.

== Architecture ==
The temple sits in a 25 hectares of complex. It was designed by Taiwanese-based Chinese architect C. Y. Lee and constructed with a cost of US$650 million.

== See also ==
- Buddhism in Taiwan
- Chung Tai Shan
- Four Great Mountains (Taiwan)
- Ocean Sky Chan Monastery, Philippines
- List of temples in Taiwan
- List of tourist attractions in Taiwan
