= Bodhiruci (8th century CE) =

Indian Buddhist monk and translator

Bodhiruci (also written Bodhiruchi or Bodairushi; Chinese: 菩提流志; 562 or 571 – 727 CE) was an Indian translator and Buddhist monk from South India. Originally named Dharmaruci (達磨流支), he is believed to have lived for 156 years. Bodhiruci travelled to China in the late 7th century, where he translated numerous texts, sutras, and commentaries from Sanskrit into Middle Chinese.

== Biography ==
Bodhiruci was born into a family of Brahmins from the Kashyapa Gotra, in South India. The year of his birth is uncertain, with sources suggesting either 562 or 571 CE. He died in 727 CE, purportedly at the age of 156. (Note: If Bodhiruci died in 727 at the age of 156, this means that he was born in 571 (although 562 is sometimes mentioned by historians).). He was educated according to the principles of his caste, but when he reached adulthood, he chose the path of Buddhism.

In 663 CE, Emperor Gaozong of Tang invited him to China. However, he delayed for 30 years, finally arriving in 693 CE, during the reign of empress Wu Zetian, who requested that he change his name from Dharmaruci to Bodhiruci.

He first settled in the monastery of Foshoujisi, in Chang'an, the ancient Chinese capital, (now Xi'an). He also stayed in Luoyang, the empire's secondary capital named Dongdu (東都), the "Eastern Capital". In 699 CE, under the direction of Śikṣānanda (652–710), he took part in the second translation of the Buddhāvataṃsaka Sūtra, better known as the Avataṃsaka Sūtra.

In 706 CE, he moved to the monastery of Chongfusi where he translated the Mahāratnakūṭa Sūtra. It took him seven years to complete the translation of the 49 sutras that make up the whole. By 713 CE, the completed edition contained 120 scrolls. During his life, he also translated other texts, sutras and commentaries.

At the age of 90, he renounced worldly life to devote himself entirely to meditation and devotion. He isolated himself completely and stopped writing, reading only his manuscripts written in Sanskrit.

== Translations ==
The following sutras, listed in the Korean Buddhist Canon: A Descriptive Catalogue, by Lewis Lancaster and Sun-bae Park, are among the 69 sutras mentioned, and include an incomplete list of translations attributed to Bodhiruci.

Tripitaka Koreana Number	Sanskrit Title and Translation Year (CE)	English title	Chinese title	Korean title	English translations (Note: Most of the texts that Bodhiruci translated into Chinese have not, to date, been translated into English or any other Western language. For this reason, in the "English translations" column of the table, a question mark (?) has been included, instead of the words "Not available", because one day, perhaps, translations published in English will be able to constitute reliable sources.)
K.18	Adhyardhaśatikāprajñāpāramitā sūtra (693)	Diamond Sutra	實相般若波羅蜜多經	실상반야바라밀다경	?
K.22 (Note: Concerning the Mahāratnakūṭa Sūtra K.22, which is made up of 49 sutras, only 27 are listed in The Korean Buddhist Canon. This means that there are 27 different web links. Not all of them have been listed here, it would have taken up too much space in the "References" section of this article. They are easily accessible via the web link Bodhiruci.); K.22(1–49)	Mahāratnakūṭa (706)	Mahāratnakūṭa Sūtra	大寶積經	대보자경	see details on article page
K.36	Sumatidārikāparipṛcchā sūtra (693)	Sumati Sūtra	須摩提經	수마제경	?
K.287	Amoghapāśakalparāja sūtra (707)	Mantra of Light	不空羂索神變眞言經	불공견삭신변진언경	
K.293	Nīlakaṇṭhaka sūtra (709)	Nīlakaṇṭha Dhāraṇī (Note: Nilakantha: this title can refer to several texts (Sutras or Dharanis), all of which have been translated under the generic title Nīlakaṇṭha. Some are invocations addressed to Avalokiteśvara, in her feminine form Guanyin; others, including the Bodhiruci one mentioned here, are addressed to the triad Amitābha, Avalokiteśvara and Mahasthamaprapta). For further information on Nilakantha, see also the article Eleven-Faced Avalokitesvara Heart Dharani Sutra.)	千手千眼觀世音菩薩姥陀羅尼身經	천수천안관세음보살모타라니신경	?
K.298	Padmacintāmaṇi dhāraṇī sūtra (709)	Dharani Sutra of the Great Wheel of Love	如意輪陀羅尼經	여의륜 다라니경	?
K.351	Sumukhanāmadhāraṇī sūtra (693)	Dharani Sutra for Protecting Life	護命法門神咒經	호명법문신주경	?
K.422	Mahāmaṇivipulavimānaviśvasupratiṣṭhita guhyaparamarahasyakalparāja dhāraṇī sūtra (706)	Dharani Sutra of the Great and Powerful Palace of Virtue and Mystery	廣大寶樓閣善住祕密陀羅尼經	광대보루각선주비밀타라니경	?
K.489	Śrīmatībrāhmāṇiparipṛcchā sūtra (693)	The Mahayana Sutra Asked by A Virtuous Woman	有德女所問大乘經	유덕녀소문대승경	?

== Bibliography ==
- P.V (Purushottam Vishvanath) Bapat (1959). 2500 Years of Buddhism. Publications Division Ministry of Information & Broadcasting, Government of India, New Delhi. p. 492. ISBN 9788123023045.
  (Note: The book has been republished several times since 1959, with a different total number of pages from that shown here).
- Lokesh Chandra (1988). The Thousand-armed Avalokiteśvara. Vol. 1. Abhinav Publications, Indira Gandhi National Centre for the Arts, New Delhi. p. 303. ISBN 81-7017-247-0.
- Martha Cheung (2014). An Anthology of Chinese Discourse on Translation. Volume 1: From Earliest Times to the Buddhist Project. Routledge, Abingdon-on-Thames,Royaume-Uni. p. 268. ISBN 978-1-317-63928-2..
- Paul W. Kroll (2018). Critical Readings on Tang China. Vol. 4. Éditions Brill, Leyde. p. 420. ISBN 978-9-004-38020-2..
- Lewis Lancaster; Sung-bae Park (1979). The Korean Buddhist Canon: A Descriptive Catalogue. University of California Press. Center for Japanese and Korean Studies. p. 724. ISBN 978-0-520-03159-3..
