= Mahāratnakūṭa Sūtra =

Sutra in Mahāyāna Buddhism

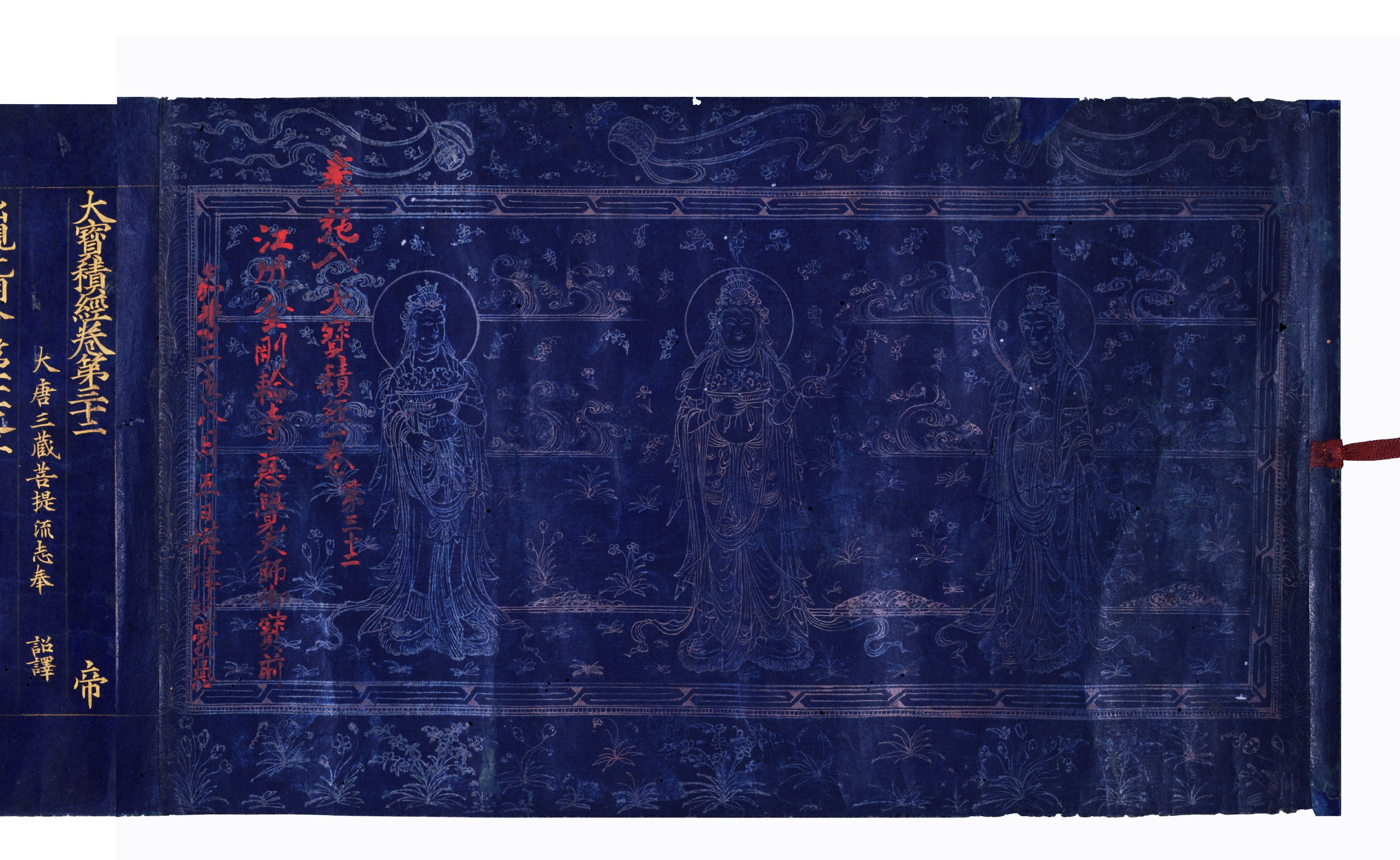
A decorative page of a Korean copy of the Heap of Jewels Sutra

The Mahāratnakūṭa Sūtra (Sanskrit; traditional Chinese: 大寶積經; simplified Chinese: 大宝积经; pinyin: dàbǎojī jīng, Tib. dam-chos dkon-mchog-brtsegs-pa) is a major ancient collection of Indian Mahāyāna Buddhist sūtras. It is also known simply as Ratnakūṭa Sūtra (寶積經), literally the Sutra of the Heap of Jewels in Sanskrit (kūṭa means ‘accumulation’ or ‘heap’).

The Mahāratnakūṭa contains many important Mahāyāna sūtras, like the Śrīmālā-devī-siṁhanāda, the Maitreya-paripṛcchā, Kāśyapa-parivarta, and the Sukhāvatīvyūha. The Heap of Jewels collection exists in Chinese and Tibetan translations. It also gives its name to one of the main divisions of Mahayana sutras in the Chinese Buddhist canon and in the Tibetan Buddhist canon.

== Overview ==
The Mahāratnakūṭa Sūtra contains 49 texts of varying length, which are termed "assemblies" by tradition. This collection includes the Śrīmālādevī Siṃhanāda Sūtra, the Longer Sukhāvatī-vyūha Sutra, the Akṣobhya-vyūha Sūtra, a long text called the Bodhisattvapiṭaka, and others.

Parts of this collection was brought to China and translated by Bodhiruci in the 8th century. Bodhiruci translated some of the texts, and included others which had been previously translated. This later Bodhiruci (also known as Bodhiruci II) should not be confused with another Bodhiruci who was the translator of the commentary on Ten Stages Sutra.

The Ratnakūṭa collection totals 49 Mahāyāna sūtras, divided into 120 fascicles in the Chinese translation. Garma Chang, who is listed as General Editor of a volume of select sūtras from the Mahāratnakūṭa translated from Chinese into English, (see below, Further Reading, Garma C.C. Chang, (1983). A Treasury of Mahāyāna Sūtras: Selections from the Mahāratnakūṭa Sūtra. Title Page) summarizes the breadth and variety of texts contained in this collection:

We have found this work to contain a broad coverage of various subjects. The topics discussed range from the monastic precepts (Vinaya) to intuitive wisdom (prajñā), from good deportment to the manifestation of the Tathāgata's light, from illusion (māyā) to ingenuity (upāya) to the nature of consciousness and the Pure Land practice. It can perhaps be called a small encyclopedia of Mahāyāna Buddhism, which should be useful to general readers as well as to scholars.

In the Taishō Tripiṭaka in volumes 11 and 12a, the Mahāratnakūṭa is the text numbered 310, and texts numbered 311 through 373 are various other translations of some of the sutras contained in the Mahāratnakūṭa.

According to the Nikāyasaṅgraha (a Theravādin text), the Ratnakūṭa Sūtra was composed by the "Andhakas", meaning the Mahāsāṃghika Caitika schools of the Āndhra region. The texts of the sutra seem to have been collected over a number of centuries, and their varying subject matter is suggestive of historical transitions between major eras of Buddhist thought. The collection may have developed from a "Bodhisattva pitaka" attributed to some of the early Mahayana schools.

== List of sutras ==
Number	Sanskrit Title	English title	Chinese title	Tibetan title (Wylie)	English translations
1	Trisaṁvara-nirdeśa	The Chapter Explaining the Three Vows	三律儀會	sdom pa gsum bstan pa'i le'u/	Translation from Tibetan by Dharmachakra translation Group (84000.co)
2	Anantamukha-pariśodhana-nirdeśa	The Chapter Teaching the Purification of Boundless Gateways	無邊莊嚴會	sgo mtha’ yas pa rnam par sbyong ba bstan pa’i le’u	Translation from Tibetan by Dharmachakra translation Group (84000)
3	Tathāgatācintya-guhya-nirdeśa	The Secrets of the Tathāgatas	密迹金剛力士會	de bzhin gshegs pa’i gsang ba	Translation from Tibetan by 84000; Translation from Chinese by Shaku Shingan
4	Svapna-nirdeśa	The Teaching on Dreams	淨居天子會	rmi lam bstan pa	Translation from Tibetan by 84000
5	Sukhāvatī-vyūha	The Array of the Blissful Land	無量壽如來會 (The Assembly of Amitāyus Tathāgata, T. 360)		Translation from Chinese in Chapter 18 of Garma Chang's A Treasury of Mahāyāna Sūtras.; Translation from Chinese by Rulu
6	Akṣobhya-tathāgatasya-vyūha	The Array of the Tathāgata Akṣobhya	不動如來會	mi 'khrugs pa'i bkod pa'i mdo/	Translation from Chinese in Chapter 17 of Garma Chang's A Treasury of Mahāyāna Sūtras
7	Varma-vyūha-nirdeśa	The Teaching of the Armor Array	被甲莊嚴會	go cha’i bkod pa bstan pa	Translation from Tibetan by Dharmachakra translation Group (84000)
8	Dharmadhātu-prakṛty-asambheda-nirdeśa	The Teaching on the Indivisible Nature of the Realm of Phenomena	法界體性無別會	chos dbyings rang bzhin dbyer med bstan pa’i mdo	Translation from Tibetan by Dharmachakra translation Group (84000)
9	Daśadharmaka	The Ten Dharmas	十法會	chos bcu pa'i mdo/	
10	Samantamukha-parivarta	The Exposition on the Universal Gateway	文殊師利普門會	kun nas sgo’i le’u	Translation from Tibetan by Dharmachakra translation Group (84000); Translation from Chinese in Chapter 8 of Garma Chang's A Treasury of Mahāyāna Sūtras
11	Raśmisamantamukta-nirdeśa	The Teaching on the Effulgence of Light	出現光明會	’od zer kun du bkye ba bstan pa	Translation from Tibetan by Dharmachakra translation Group (84000); Translation from Chinese in Chapter 11 of Garma Chang's A Treasury of Mahāyāna Sūtras
12	Bodhisattva-piṭaka	The Basket of Bodhisatva [teachings]	菩薩藏經	byang chub sems dpa’i sde snod	Translation from Tibetan by The Norwegian Institute of Palaeography and Historical Philology, 84000
13	Āyuṣman-nanda-garbhāvakrānti-nirdeśa	The Teaching to the Venerable Nanda on Dwelling in the Womb	佛爲阿難說處胎會	tshe dang ldan pa dga’ bo la mngal na gnas pa bstan pa	
14	Nanda-garbhāvakrānti-nirdeśa	The Teaching to the Venerable Nanda on Entry into the Womb	佛說入胎藏會	tshe dang ldan pa dga’ bo la mngal du ’jug pa bstan pa	Translation from Tibetan by Robert Kritzer, 84000
15	Mañjuśrī-buddhakṣetra-guṇa-vyūha	The Array of Virtues of Mañjuśrī’s Buddhafield	文殊師利授記會	’jam dpal gyi sangs rgyas kyi zhing gi yon tan bkod pa	Translation from Tibetan by Dharmachakra translation Group (84000); Translation from Chinese in Chapter 10 of Garma Chang's A Treasury of Mahāyāna Sūtras
16	Pitāputrasamāgamana	The Meeting of Father and Son	菩薩見實會	yab sras mjal ba'i mdo/	
17	Pūrṇa-paripṛcchā	The Questions of Pūrṇa	富樓那會 / 富樓那問經 / 菩薩藏經	gang pos zhus pa	Translation from Tibetan by Dharmachakra translation Group (84000)
18	Rāṣṭrapāla-paripṛcchā	The Questions of Rāṣṭrapāla	護國菩薩會經	yul ’khor skyong gis zhus pa	Translation from Tibetan by the Vienna Buddhist Translation Studies Group, 84000.; Translation from Chinese in Boucher, Daniel (2008). Bodhisattvas of the forest and the formation of the Mahāyāna a study and translation of the Rāṣṭrapālaparipṛchā-sūtra.
19	Gṛhapaty-Ugra-paripṛcchā	The Sūtra of Ugra's Questions	郁伽長者會 / 郁伽羅越問菩薩經	drag shul can gyis zhus pa'i mdo/	Translation from Chinese in Nattier, Jan (2005). A Few Good Men: The Bodhisattva Path According to the Inquiry of Ugra (Ugrapariprcchā). Univ of Hawaii Pr.
20	Vidyutprāpta-paripṛcchā	The Sūtra of Vidyutprāpta's Questions	無盡伏藏會	glog thob kyis zhus pa'i mdo/	Translation from Chinese in Chapter 9 of Garma Chang's A Treasury of Mahāyāna Sūtras
21	Bhadramāyākāra-vyākaraṇa	The Prophecy for Bhadra the Illusionist	授幻師跋陀羅記會	sgyu ma mkhan bzang po lung bstan pa	Translation from Tibetan by 84000.co; Translation from Chinese by Lapis Lazuli Texts; Translation from Chinese in Chapter 1 of Garma Chang's A Treasury of Mahāyāna Sūtras
22	Mahā-prātihārya-nirdeśa	The Teaching of the Great Magical Display	大變會	cho 'phrul chen po bstan pa'i mdo/	
23	Maitreya-mahāsiṁhanāda	The Great Lion’s Roar of Maitreya	摩訶迦葉會 / 大迦葉經	byams pa’i seng ge’i sgra chen po	Translated from Tibetan by Karen Liljenberg and Ulrich Pagel
24	Upāli-paripṛcchā	Upāli’s Questions	優波離會	’dul ba rnam par gtan la dbab pa nye bar ’khor gyis zhus pa	Translated from Tibetan by the UCSB Buddhist Studies Translation Group, 84000.co; Translation from Chinese in Chapter 15 of Garma Chang's A Treasury of Mahāyāna Sūtras
25	Adhyāśaya-saṁcodana	Inspiring Determination	發勝志樂會	lhag bsam skul ba	Translated from Tibetan by the Blazing Wisdom Translation Group, 84000.co
26	Subāhu-paripṛcchā	Subāhu's Questions	善臂菩薩會	lag bzangs kyis zhus pa’i mdo	Translation from Tibetan by Dharmachakra translation Group (84000)
27	Surata-paripṛcchā	Surata’s Questions	善順菩薩會	des pas zhus pa’i mdo	Translated from Tibetan by the UCSB Translation Group 2, 84000; Translation from Chinese in Chapter 13 of Garma Chang's A Treasury of Mahāyāna Sūtras
28	Vīradatta-gṛhapati-paripṛcchā	The Questions of the Householder Vīradatta	勸授長者會	khyim bdag dpas byin gyis zhus pa	Translated from Tibetan by the University of Calgary Buddhist Studies team, 84000
29	Udayanavatsarāja-paripṛcchā	Questions of King Udayana of Vatsa	優陀延王會	bad sa’i rgyal po ’char byed kyis zhus pa	Translation from Tibetan by 84000.co
30	Sumatidārikā-paripṛcchā	Questions of the Girl Sumati	妙慧童女經	bu mo blo gros bzang mos zhus pa	Translation from Tibetan by 84000.co; Translation from Chinese by Lapis Lazuli Texts; Translation from Chinese in Chapter 14 of Garma Chang's A Treasury of Mahāyāna Sūtras
31	Gaṅgottarā-paripṛcchā	The Questions of Gaṅgottarā	恒河上優婆夷會	gang gA’i mchog gis zhus pa	Translation from Tibetan by 84000.co; Translation from Chinese by Lapis Lazuli Texts; Translation from Chinese in Chapter 3 of Garma Chang's A Treasury of Mahāyāna Sūtras
32	Aśokadatta-vyākaraṇa	Aśokadattā’s Prophecy	無畏德菩薩會 / 無畏德經	mya ngan med kyis byin pa lung bstan pa	Translation from Tibetan by 84000.co; Translation from Chinese in Chapter 7 of Garma Chang's A Treasury of Mahāyāna Sūtras
33	Vimaladattā-paripṛcchā	Vimaladatta's Questions	無垢施菩薩應辯會 / 無垢菩薩分別應辯經	dri ma med kyis byin pas zhus pa'i mdo/	Translation from Chinese in Chapter 5 of Garma Chang's A Treasury of Mahāyāna Sūtras
34	Guṇaratnasaṁkusumita-paripṛcchā	The Questions of Guṇaratnasaṅkusumita	功德寶花敷菩薩會	yon tan rin chen me tog kun tu rgyas pas zhus pa	Translation from Tibetan by Dharmachakra translation Group (84000)
35	Acintyabuddhaviṣaya-nirdeśa	The Teaching on the Inconceivable Scope of a Buddha	善德天子會	sangs rgyas kyi yul bsam gyis mi khyab pa bstan pa	Translation from Tibetan by 84000.co; Translation from Chinese in Chapter 2 of Garma Chang's A Treasury of Mahāyāna Sūtras
36	Susthitamati-devaputra-paripṛcchā	The Sūtra of the Devaputra Susthitamati's Questions	善住意天子會	lha'i bu blo gros rab gnas kyis zhus pa'i mdo/	Translation from Chinese in Chapter 4 of Garma Chang's A Treasury of Mahāyāna Sūtras
37	Siṁha-paripṛcchā	Siṃha’s Questions	阿闍世王子會	seng ges zhus pa	Translated from Tibetan by the Kīrtimukha Translation Group, 84000.co
38	Upāyakauśalya-jñānottara-bodhisattva-paripṛcchā	Bodhisattva Jñānottara's Questions on Skillful Means	大乘方便會 (The Mahayana Assembly of Skillful Means)	byang sems ye shes dam pas zhus pa'i le'u/	Translation from Chinese in Chapter 22 of Garma Chang's A Treasury of Mahāyāna Sūtras
39	Bhadrapāla-śreṣṭhi-paripṛcchā	The Questions of Bhadrapāla the Merchant	賢護長者會 / 移識經	tshong dpon bzang skyong gis zhus pa	Translated by Karen Liljenberg and Ulrich Pagel, 84000; Translation from Chinese in Chapter 12 of Garma Chang's A Treasury of Mahāyāna Sūtras
40	Dārikā Vimalaśraddhā paripṛcchā	The Questions of the Girl Vimalaśraddhā (or Vimalaśuddha)	淨信童女會	bu mo rnam dag dad pas zhus pa	Translated from Tibetan by The Karma Gyaltsen Ling Translation Group, 84000
41	Maitreya-paripṛcchā-dharmāṣṭaka	The Question of Maitreya on the Eight Qualities	彌勒菩薩問八法會	byams pas chos brgyad zhus pa	Translated from Tibetan by Karen Liljenberg and Ulrich Pagel, 84000
42	Maitreya-paripṛcchā	The Questions of Maitreya	彌勒菩薩所問會	byams pas zhus pa	Translated from Tibetan by Karen Liljenberg, 84000
43	Kāśyapa-parivarta	The Kāśyapa Discourse	普明菩薩會 / 古大寶積經	od srungs kyi le'u/	Translation from Chinese in Chapter 20 of Garma Chang's A Treasury of Mahāyāna Sūtras
44	Ratnarāśi-sūtra	The Mass of Jewels	寶梁聚會 / 寶梁經	rin po che'i phung po'i mdo/	Silk, Jonathan. The Origins and Early History of the Mahāratnakūṭa Tradition of Mahāyāna Buddhism with a Study of the Ratnarāśisūtra and Related Materials, 1994.; Translation from Chinese in Chapter 16 of Garma Chang's A Treasury of Mahāyāna Sūtras
45	Akṣayamati-paripṛcchā	Akṣayamati's Questions	無盡慧菩薩會	blo gros mi zad pas zhus pa'i mdo/	Translation from Chinese in Chapter 21 of Garma Chang's A Treasury of Mahāyāna Sūtras
46	Saptaśatikā-nāma-prajñāpāramitā	The Seven Hundred [śloka] Perfection of Wisdom	文殊說般若會 (The Assembly Where Mañjuśrī Expounds Prajñāpāramitā)	sher phyin bdun brgya pa/	Translation from Chinese by Lapis Lazuli Texts; Translation from Chinese in Chapter 6 of Garma Chang's A Treasury of Mahāyāna Sūtras
47	Ratnacūḍa-paripṛcchā	Ratnacūḍa's Questions	寶髻菩薩會	gtsug na rin po ches zhus pa'i mdo/	
48	Śrīmālā-devī-siṁhanāda	The Lion's Roar of Śrīmālādevī	勝鬘夫人會	lha mo dpal phreng gi seng ge'i sgra'i mdo/	Paul, Diana. The Sutra of Queen Śrīmālā of the Lion’s Roar, BDK.; Translation from Chinese in Chapter 19 of Garma Chang's A Treasury of Mahāyāna Sūtras
49	Ṛṣi-Vyāsa-paripṛcchā	The Rishi Vyāsa’s Questions	廣博仙人會	drang srong rgyas pas zhus pa	Translated from Tibetan by David Jackson, 84000
