= University of the West =

Buddhist private university in Rosemead, California

Coordinates: 34.045618°N 118.083241°W

- 西來大學 (Chinese)
- Motto: 覺悟本志 (Chinese)
- Motto in English: Awaken Your Purpose
- Type: Private university
- Established: 1990
- Affiliations: Western Association of Schools and Colleges
- Religious affiliation: Buddhist (Fo Guang Shan)
- President: Minh-Hoa Ta
- Faculty: 56
- Students: 180
- Undergraduates: 77
- Postgraduates: 103
- Location: Rosemead, California, United States
- Campus: 10 acres (4 ha); Suburban
- Colors: Burgundy/Gold
- Nickname: UWest
- Website: www.uwest.edu

Chinese name
- Simplified Chinese: 西来大学
- Traditional Chinese: 西來大學
Transcriptions
Standard Mandarin
- Hanyu Pinyin: Xīlái Dàxué

University of the West (UWest) is a private Buddhist university in Rosemead, California, United States. It was founded in 1990 by Hsing Yun, founder of the Taiwan-based Buddhist order Fo Guang Shan and Hsi Lai Temple, the North American order headquarters. The school offered its first class in spring of 1991.

UWest is accredited by the WASC Senior College and University Commission. Founded by a Buddhist organization, UWest is described in their official documents as a "Buddhist-affiliated university" that is "informed by Buddhist wisdom," but UWest students are not required to be members of Fo Guang Shan or practice Buddhism in any form.

== History ==
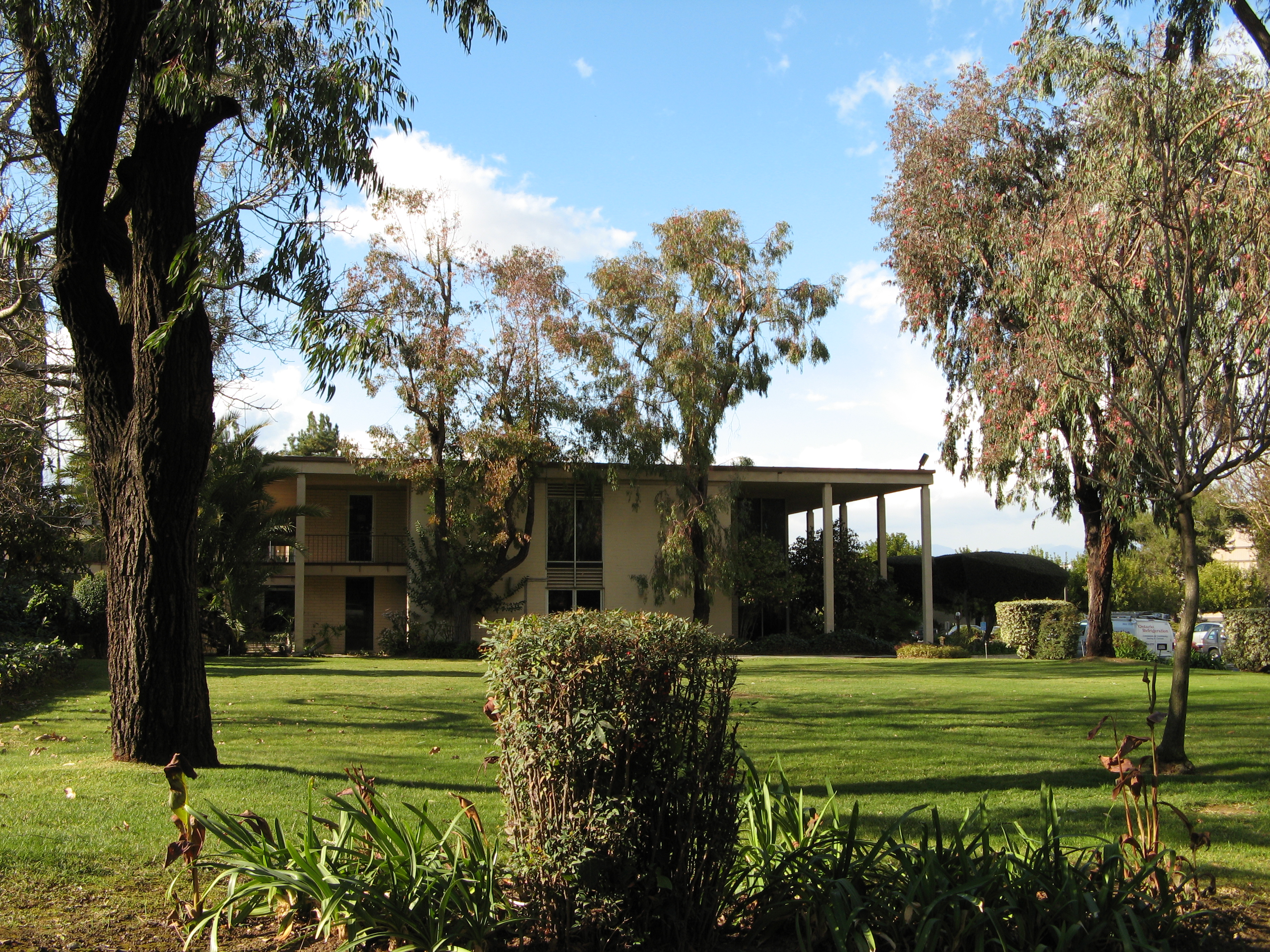
View of campus

University of the West, originally incorporated as Hsi Lai University, (Chinese: 西來大學; pinyin: Xī Lái Dàxué) started in a small classroom in Hsi Lai Temple, the North American head branch of the Fo Guang Shan order. In its first semester (1991) the school had only four professors and a student body of around 30 students made up of monks and nuns from the temple. Early instructors were Roger Schmidt, Dan Lusthaus, Jim Santucci (now chair of the Department of Comparative Religion at California State University, Fullerton), and Lewis Lancaster, an eminent Western scholar of Buddhism, a former UWest president and now Chair Emeritus at University of California, Berkeley. Each of those original professors has returned to the UWest campus to teach or act in administrative roles (or both).

In 1996, Fo Guang Shan purchased a property at 1409 Walnut Grove Ave. in Rosemead, California, a multicultural suburb of the San Gabriel Valley, approximately ten miles east of downtown Los Angeles. The campus belonged to Biola University at the time and was the site of Biola's seminary school. According to Jim Chen, a UWest professor of accounting and one of the original negotiators of the property purchase, the Evangelical Christian-based Biola organization was very reluctant to sell the property to a Buddhist organization. After a tussle, the property was successfully purchased.

At that time, the university decided to pursue accreditation while also adding additional programs to its offerings. Undergraduate and advanced degrees in business, English, psychology, philosophy, Chinese language, Buddhist chaplaincy, and religious studies were added. An English as a Second Language program was also established, given the international character of students attracted to the school. The degree programs in history, philosophy, Chinese language, and the bachelor of arts in Buddhist studies, are no longer offered, however, they remain accredited should the university revisit them in the future.

The accreditation process took approximately 10 years to complete, with former dean of academic affairs and noted Buddhist scholar Ananda Guruge steering the drive for WASC recognition. Accreditation was granted in February, 2006. Shortly thereafter a drive to attract American students to the campus was initiated. As of 2014, approximately 40% of the student body are American citizens or permanent residents.

=== Board of trustees ===
Overall governance of the university lies in the hands of its 15-member board of trustees. The trustees select the president, oversee all faculty and senior administrative appointments, monitor the budget, supervise the endowment, and protect university property.

=== Presidents ===
The president of University of the West is Minh-Hoa Ta.

Past presidents include:

- Hsing Yun (1990–1998)
- Naichen Chen (1998–2004)
- Lewis Lancaster (2004–2006)
- Roger Schmidt (2004–2007)
- Allen Huang (2007–2009)
- Chack-Fan Lee (2009–2010)
- Chin-Shun Wu (2010–2013)
- Stephen Morgan (2013–2018)
- Otto Chang (2018–2019)
- Chiung-Sally Chou (interim, 2019–2020)

== Enrollment ==
UWest enrollment stood at 383 students as of the fall 2017 semester. The campus has seen a significant growth in population since accreditation in 2006. The student body is approximately 50% international and 50% domestic. Aside from U.S. students, the student body is made up of students from more than 44 countries.

== Research centers ==
- Institute for the Study of Humanistic Buddhism
- Digital Sanskrit Buddhist Canon
- Institute of Chinese Buddhist Studies
- The Center for the Study of Minority and Small Business (CSMSB)

== Accreditation ==
UWest was accredited in February 2006 by the Western Association of Schools and Colleges (now the WASC Senior College and University Commission).

== Facilities ==
University of the West consists of three main buildings, two residence halls and an auditorium on a 10-acre (4.0 ha) hilltop campus.

The lower floor of the administration building offers services such as financial aid, admissions, student accounts, registrar etc. The upper floor features classrooms, an investment lab for business students, and the offices of the president. The administration building underwent a major modernization from 2003 to 2012.

The three-story education building houses the library, student services, Kenneth A. Locke Hall, IT services, classrooms, academic departments, professors' offices, and the Student Success Center. The building was modernized in 2003–2012.

The recreation building at the top of the campus hosts the dining hall, recreation game room, and student kitchen.

Other facilities include pool and spa, gym, and basketball court.

== Notable faculty and alumni ==
- Ananda W. P. Guruge – Buddhist scholar and diplomat, former Dean of Academic Affairs
- Lewis Lancaster – Linguistics scholar, former president of UWest
- Hsin Ting – Buddhist monk, abbot emeritus of Fo Guang Shan

== See also ==
- Buddhist universities in the United States and Canada
