= Jung-kwang =

South Korean Buddhist monk (1935–2003)

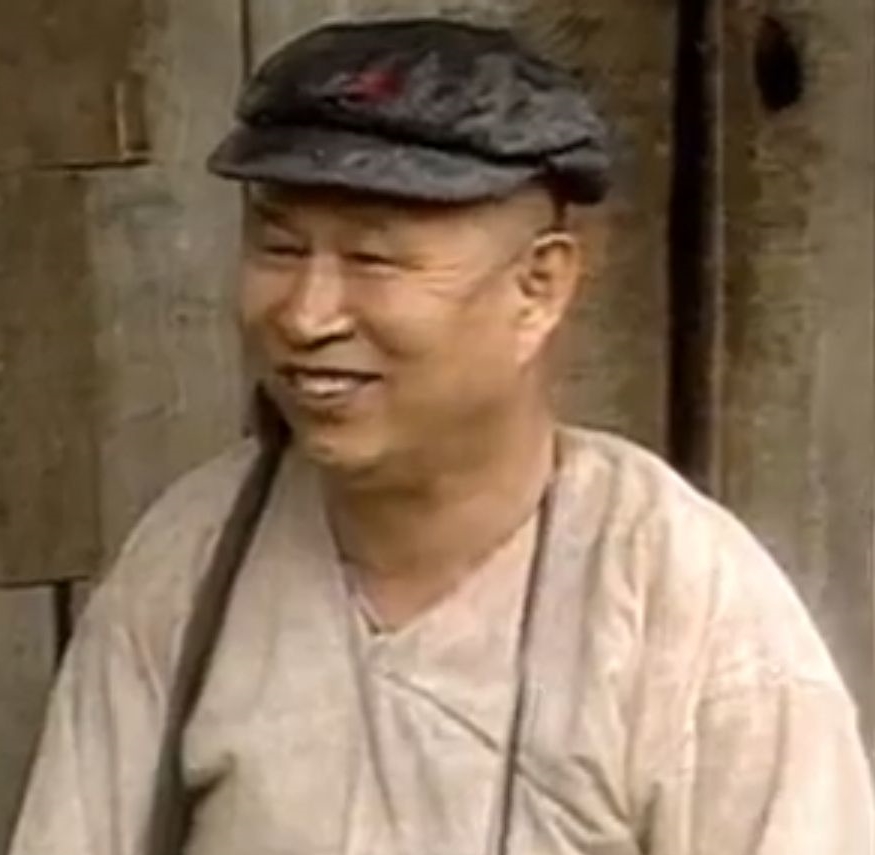
- Born: Go Chang-ryul; January 4, 1935; Jeju Island, Zenranan-dō, Korea, Empire of Japan
- Died: January 5, 2003 (aged 68)
- Resting place: Yangsan, South Gyeongsang Province, South Korea
- Known for: Bizarre paintings and eccentric life style

Ink brush painting of Bodhidarma created by Jung-kwang during an art class demonstration at Berkeley High School in 1979

Jung-kwang or Junggwang (Korean: 중광; Hanja: 重光; January 4, 1935 – January 5, 2003) was a Korean monk, who became an artist known for his bizarre paintings and eccentric life style. He was born with the name Go Chang-ryul, and used that name until he became a monk at age 25. Because of his behavior, he was expelled from his monastic order in 1979.

In the fall of 1977, University of California Professor Lewis Lancaster accompanied Jung-kwang as they traveled through Korea, and published a book based on their trip. In 1979, he gave a demonstration to a high school art class, completing a painting in seconds. In 1980, Jung-kwang lectured at the University of California at Berkeley and Stanford University. His work is included in collections of the Asian Art Museum (San Francisco), the Asia Society Gallery (Rockfeller Foundation, New York), and The British Museum. He has authored several books.

According to religion life author Vincent Biondo, Jung-kwang "described himself as a 'Buddhist mop,' which gets dirty itself, but makes everything it touches clean."

Jung-kwang drank makkeolli, a Korean alcoholic beverage, and he also smoked. He was in poor health for about five years prior to his death on the day after his 68th birthday. He was cremated in Yangsan, South Gyeongsang province, South Korea.
