= Buddhist universities and colleges in the United States =

There are several Buddhist universities in the United States. Some of these have existed for decades and are accredited. Others are relatively new and are either in the process of being accredited or else have no formal accreditation. The list includes:

- Dhammakaya Open University – located in Azusa, California, part of the Thai Wat Phra Dhammakaya
- Dharmakirti College – located in Tucson, Arizona Now called Awam Tibetan Buddhist Institute (http://awaminstitute.org/)
- Dharma Realm Buddhist University – located in Ukiah, California (Accredited by the WASC Senior College and University Commission)
- Ewam Buddhist Institute – located in Arlee, Montana
- Naropa University is located in Boulder, Colorado (Accredited by the Higher Learning Commission)
- Institute of Buddhist Studies – located in Berkeley, California
- Maitripa College – located in Portland, Oregon
- Soka University of America – located in Aliso Viejo, California
- University of the West – located in Rosemead, California (Accredited by the WASC Senior College and University Commission)
- Won Institute of Graduate Studies – located in Glenside, Pennsylvania
