= Diamond Sutra =

Buddhist sutra in Mahāyāna Buddhism

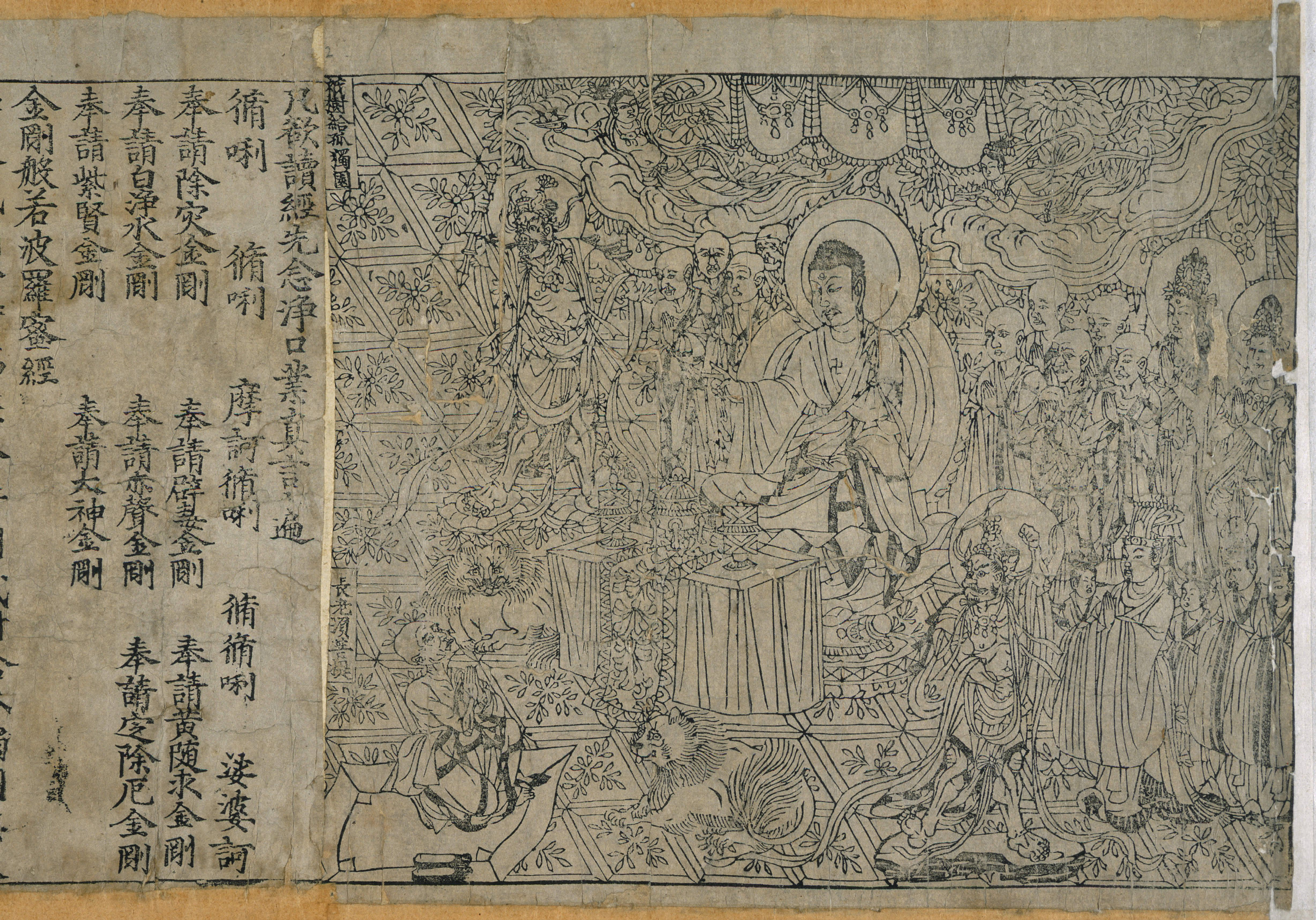
- Frontispiece of the Chinese Diamond Sūtra, printed on the 13th day of the 4th moon of the 9th year of the Xiantong era of the Tang dynasty, i.e. May 11, 868 CE, the oldest known dated printed book in the world. British Library

Information
- Religion: Mahāyāna Buddhism
- Author: Unknown
- Language: Sanskrit
- Period: 1st–5th century CE

Full text
- Diamond Sutra at English Wikisource

The Diamond Sūtra (Sanskrit: Vajracchedikā Prajñāpāramitā Sūtra) is a Mahāyāna Buddhist sutra from the genre of Prajñāpāramitā ('perfection of wisdom') sutras. Translated into a variety of languages over a broad geographic range, the Diamond Sūtra is one of the most influential Mahayana sutras in East Asia, and it is particularly prominent within the Chan (or Zen) tradition, along with the Heart Sutra.

A copy of the Tang dynasty Diamond Sūtra was discovered among the Dunhuang manuscripts in 1900 by Daoist monk Wang Yuanlu and sold to Aurel Stein in 1907. It dates back to May 11, 868 CE and is broadly considered to be the oldest extant printed book, although other, earlier, printed materials on paper exist that predate this artifact.

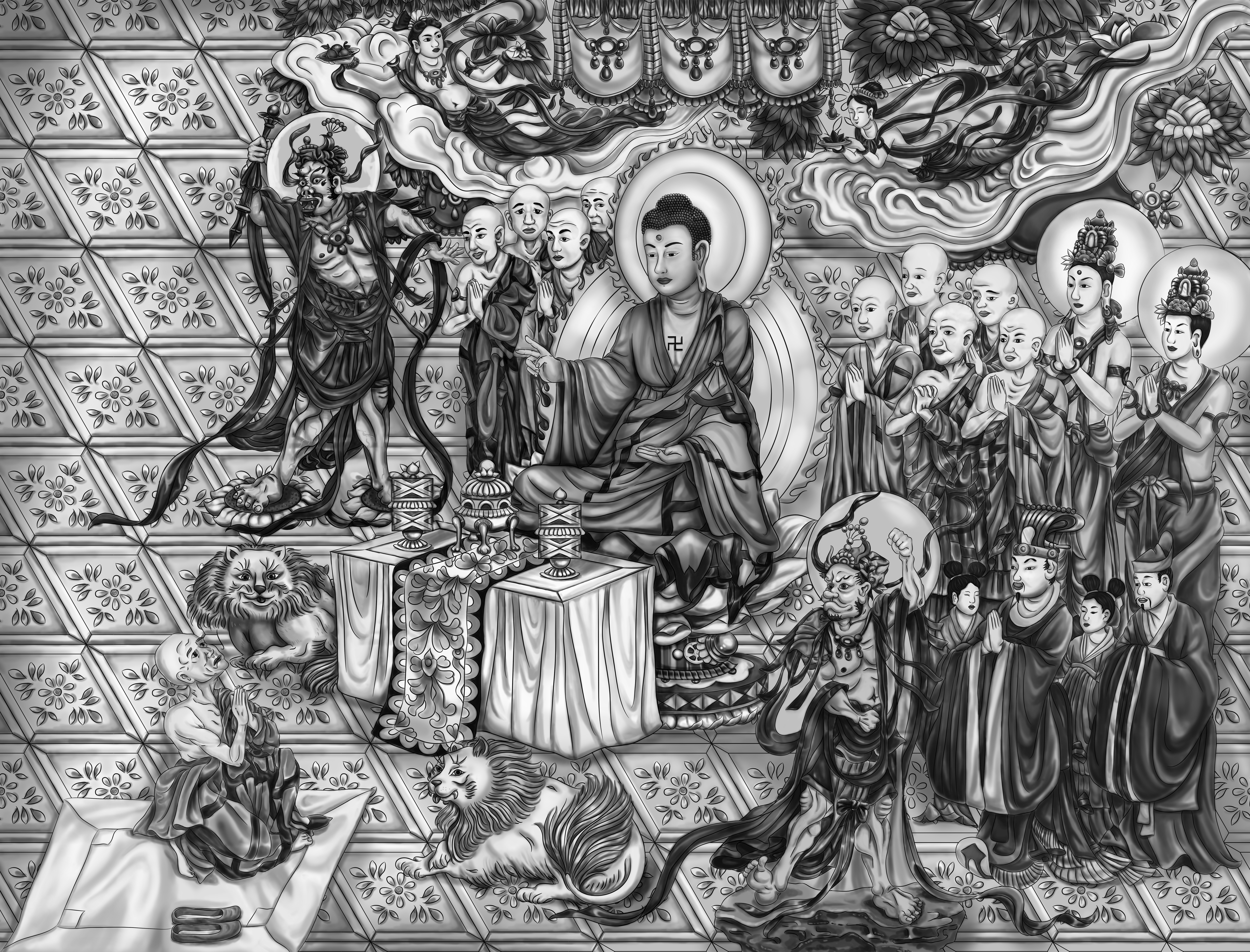
This painting is a redrawing based on a sketch of the Diamond Sūtra found in the Mogao Caves.

The book of the Diamond Sūtra is also the first known creative work with an explicit public domain dedication, as its colophon at the end states that it was created "for universal free distribution".

== Title ==
The Sanskrit title for the sūtra is the Vajracchedikā Prajñāpāramitā Sūtra, which may be translated roughly as the 'Vajra Cutter Perfection of Wisdom Sūtra' or 'The Perfection of Wisdom Text that Cuts Like a Thunderbolt'. In English, shortened forms such as Diamond Sūtra and Vajra Sūtra are common. The title relies on the power of the vajra (diamond or thunderbolt, but also an abstract term for a powerful weapon) to cut things as a metaphor for the type of wisdom that cuts and shatters illusions to get to ultimate reality. The sutra is also called by the name "Triśatikā Prajñāpāramitā Sūtra" (300 lines on the Perfection of Wisdom sutra).

The Diamond Sūtra is highly regarded in East Asian countries with traditions of Mahayana Buddhism. Translations of this title into the languages of some of these countries include:

- Chinese: 金剛般若波羅蜜多經, Jīngāng Bōrě-bōluómìduō Jīng; shortened to 金剛經, Jīngāng Jīng
- Japanese: 金剛般若波羅蜜多経, Kongō hannya haramita kyō; shortened to 金剛経, Kongō-kyō
- Korean: 금강반야바라밀경, geumgang banyabaramil gyeong; shortened to 금강경, geumgang gyeong
- Classical Mongolian: Yeke kölgen sudur
- Old Uighur: 𐽷𐽶𐽹 𐽷𐽳 𐽷𐽶 𐽻𐽳𐽸𐽳𐽾 (Kim-ko-ke Sudur)
- Vietnamese: Kim cương bát-nhã-ba-la-mật-đa kinh; shortened to Kim cương kinh
- Standard Tibetan: འཕགས་པ་ཤེས་རབ་ཀྱི་ཕ་རོལ་ཏུ་ཕྱིན་པ་རྡོ་རྗེ་གཅོད་པ་ཞེས་བྱ་བ་ཐེག་པ་ཆེན་པོའི་མདོ།, 'phags pa shes rab kyi pha rol tu phyin pa rdo rje gcod pa zhes bya ba theg pa chen po'i mdo
- Tangut: 𗵒𘗁𘄒𘎑𘏞𗓽𗕥𗸰𗖰𗚩, *kiẹ¹ dźja² pa² rja² po¹ lo¹ bji̱² tow¹ lwər² lhejr²

== History ==
The exact date of the composition of the Diamond Sūtra in Sanskrit is uncertain—arguments for the 2nd and 5th centuries have been made. The first Chinese translation dates to the early 5th century, but, by this point, the 4th or 5th century monks Asanga and Vasubandhu seem to have already authored authoritative commentaries on its content.

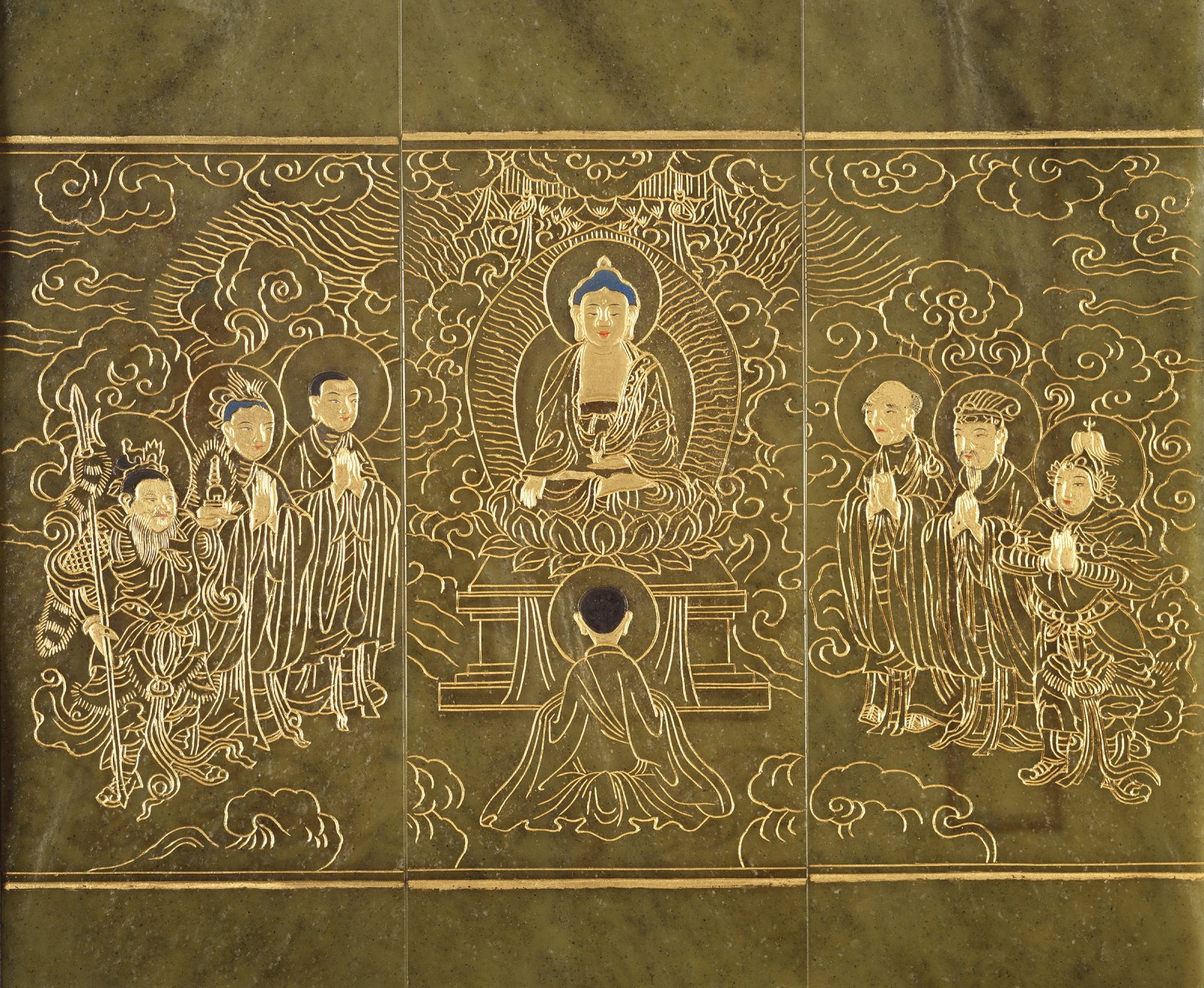
Frontispiece of the 'Diamond Sutra' written in Chinese, engraved and gilded on nephrite jade. China, 1732. Chester Beatty Library

The Vajracchedika sutra was an influential work in the Mahayana Buddhist tradition. Early translations into a number of languages have been found in locations across Central and East Asia, suggesting that the text was widely studied and translated. In addition to Chinese translations, translations of the text and commentaries were made into Tibetan, and translations, elaborations, and paraphrases survive in a number of Central Asian languages.

The first translation of the Diamond Sūtra into Chinese is thought to have been made in 401 by the venerated and prolific translator Kumārajīva. Kumārajīva's translation style is distinctive, possessing a flowing smoothness that reflects his prioritization on conveying the meaning as opposed to precise literal rendering. The Kumārajīva translation has been particularly highly regarded over the centuries, and it is this version that appears on the 868 Dunhuang scroll. It is the most widely used and chanted Chinese version.

In addition to the Kumārajīva translation, a number of later translations exist. The Diamond Sūtra was again translated from Sanskrit into Chinese by Bodhiruci (the one from North India) in 509, Paramārtha in 558, Dharmagupta (twice, in 590 and in 605~616), Xuanzang (twice, in 648 and in 660~663), Bodhiruci (the one from South India) in 693, and Yijing in 703.

The Chinese Buddhist monk Xuanzang visited a Mahāsāṃghika-Lokottaravāda monastery at Bamiyan, Afghanistan, in the 7th century. Using Xuanzang's travel accounts, modern archaeologists have identified the site of this monastery. Birchbark manuscript fragments of several Mahāyāna sūtras have been discovered at the site, including the Vajracchedikā Prajñāpāramitā Sūtra (MS 2385), and these are now part of the Schøyen Collection. This manuscript was written in the Sanskrit language, and written in an ornate form of the Gupta script. This same Sanskrit manuscript also contains the Medicine Buddha Sūtra (Bhaiṣajyaguruvaiḍūryaprabhārāja Sūtra).

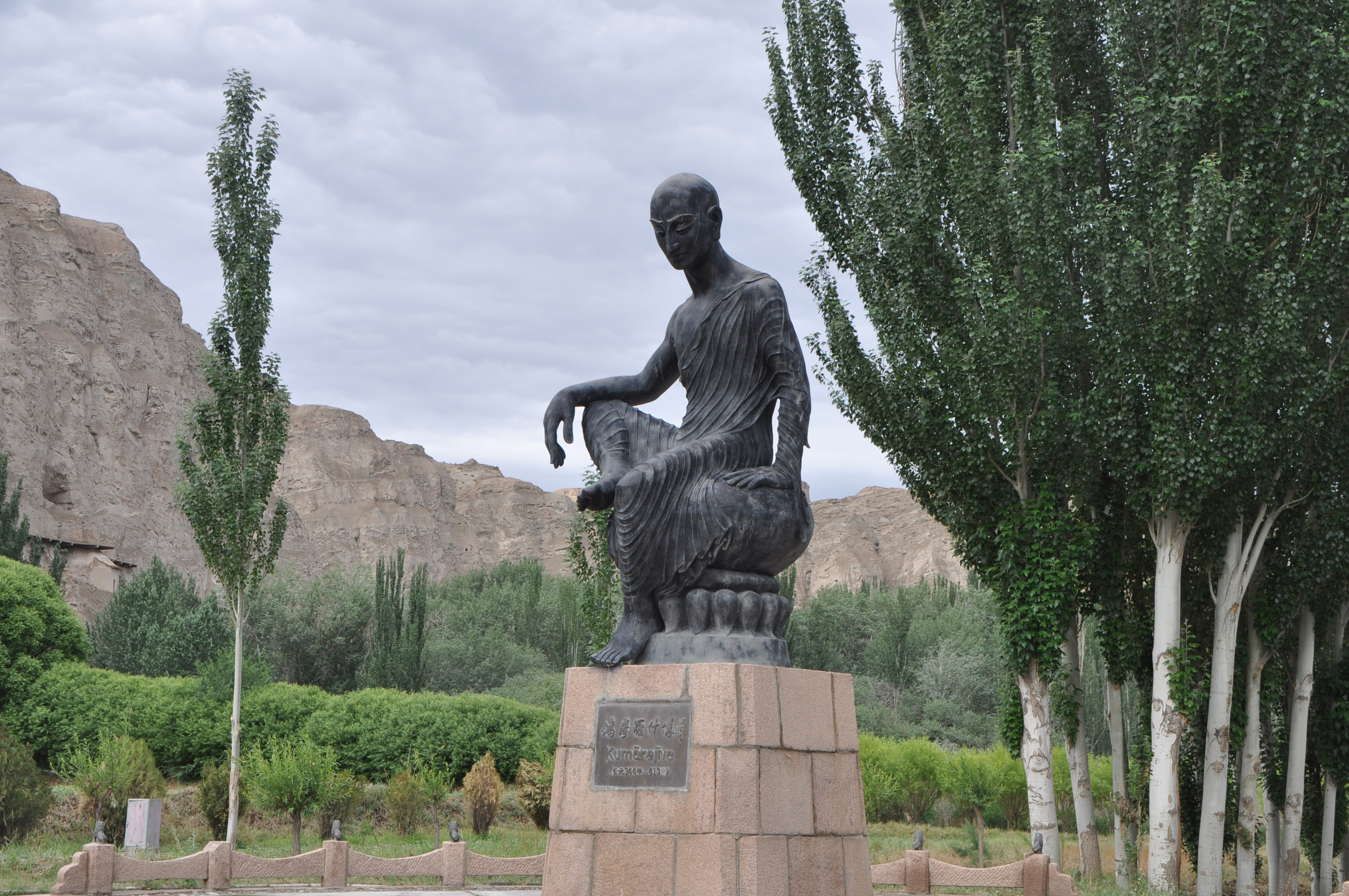
Statue of Kumārajīva in front of the Kizil Caves in Kuqa, Xinjiang province, China

The Diamond Sūtra gave rise to a culture of artwork, sūtra veneration, and commentaries in East Asian Buddhism. By the end of the Tang dynasty (907) in China there were over 80 commentaries written on it (only 32 survive), such as those by prominent Chinese Buddhists like Sengzhao, Xie Lingyun, Zhiyi, Jizang, Kuiji and Zongmi. Copying and recitation of the Diamond Sutra was a widespread devotional practice, and stories attributing miraculous powers to these acts are recorded in Chinese, Japanese, Tibetan, and Mongolian sources.

One of the best known commentaries is the Exegesis on the Diamond Sutra by Huineng, the Sixth Patriarch of the Chan School. The Diamond Sutra features prominently in the 1st chapter of the Platform Sutra, the religious biography of Huineng, where hearing its recitation is supposed to have triggered the enlightening insight that led Huineng to abandon his life as a woodcutter to become a Buddhist monk.

== Contents ==
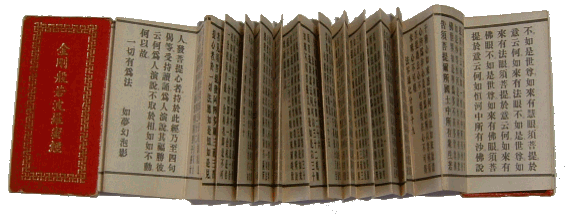
A traditional pocket-sized folding edition of the Diamond Sūtra in Chinese

The Vajracchedikā Prajñāpāramitā Sutra contains the discourse of the Buddha to a senior monk, Subhuti. Its major themes are anatman (not-self), the emptiness of all phenomena (though the term 'śūnyatā' itself does not appear in the text), the liberation of all beings without attachment and the importance of spreading and teaching the Diamond Sūtra itself. In his commentary on the Diamond Sūtra, Hsing Yun describes the four main points from the sūtra as giving without attachment to self, liberating beings without notions of self and other, living without attachment, and cultivating without attainment. According to Shigenori Nagatomo, the major goal of the Diamond Sūtra is: "an existential project aiming at achieving and embodying a non-discriminatory basis for knowledge" or "the emancipation from the fundamental ignorance of not knowing how to experience reality as it is".

In the sūtra, the Buddha has finished his daily walk to Sravasti with the monks to gather offerings of food, and he sits down to rest. Elder Subhūti comes forth and asks the Buddha: "How, Lord, should one who has set out on the bodhisattva path take his stand, how should he proceed, how should he control the mind?" What follows is a dialogue regarding the nature of the "perfection of insight" (Prajñāpāramitā) and the nature of ultimate reality (which is illusory and empty). The Buddha begins by answering Subhuti by stating that he will bring all living beings to final nirvana (extinction, blowout), but that after this "no living being whatsoever has been brought to extinction". This is because a bodhisattva does not see beings through reified concepts such as "person", "soul" or "self", but sees them through the lens of perfect understanding, as empty of inherent, unchanging self.

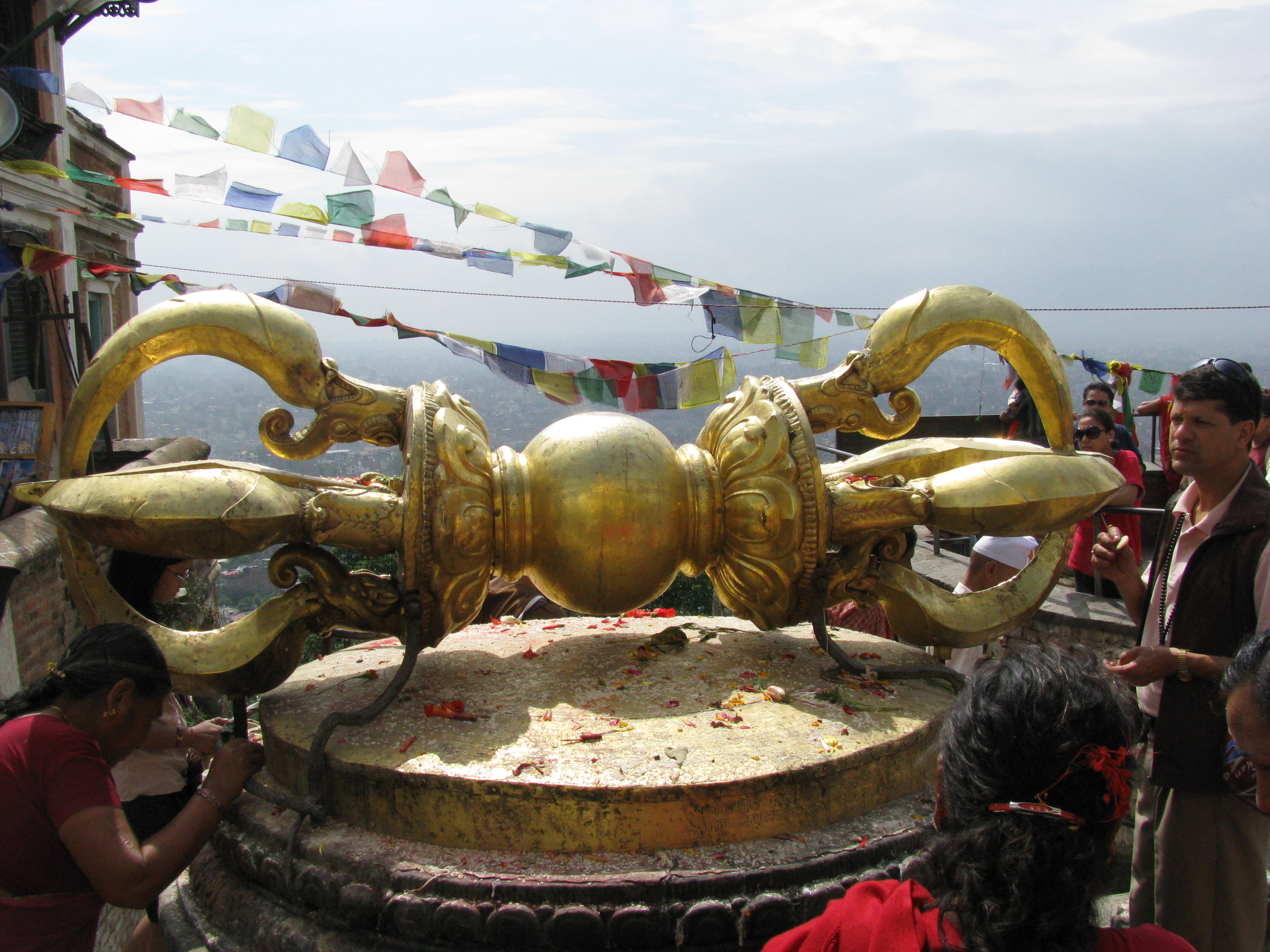
A Nepalese sculpture of a vajra

The Buddha continues his exposition with similar statements which use negation to point out the emptiness of phenomena, merit, the Dharma (Buddha's teaching), the stages of enlightenment and the Buddha himself. Japanese Buddhologist Hajime Nakamura calls this negation the "logic of not" (na prthak). Further examples of the Diamond Sūtra's via negativa include statements such as:

- "As far as 'all dharmas' are concerned, Subhuti, all of them are dharma-less. That is why they are called 'all dharmas'."
- "Those so-called 'streams of thought', Subhuti, have been preached by the Tathagata as streamless. That is why they are called 'streams of thought'."
- "'All beings', Subhuti, have been preached by the Tathagata as beingless. That is why they are called 'all beings'."

The Buddha is generally thought to be trying to help Subhūti unlearn his preconceived, limited notions of the nature of reality. Emphasizing that all phenomena are ultimately illusory, he teaches that true enlightenment cannot be grasped until one has set aside attachment to them in any form. Another reason why the Buddha makes use of negation is that language reifies concepts and this can lead to attachment to those concepts, but true wisdom is seeing that nothing is fixed or stable, hence according to the Diamond Sūtra thoughts such as "I have obtained the state of an Arhat" or "I will bring living beings to nirvana" do not even occur in an enlightened one's mind because this would be "seizing upon a self ... seizing upon a living being, seizing upon a soul, seizing upon a person".

The sutra goes on to state that anyone who says such things should not be called a bodhisattva. According to David Kalupahana the goal of the Diamond Sūtra is "one colossal attempt to avoid the extremist use of language, that is, to eliminate any ontological commitment to concepts while at the same time retaining their pragmatic value, so as not to render them totally empty of meaning".

Kalupahana explains the negation of the Diamond Sūtra by seeing an initial statement as an erroneous affirmation of substance or selfhood, which is then critiqued ("'all dharmas' are dharmaless"), and then finally reconstructed ("that is why they are called 'all dharmas'") as being conventional and dependently originated. Kalupahana explains this final reconstruction as meaning: "that each concept, instead of either representing a unique entity or being an empty term, is a substitute for a human experience which is conditioned by a variety of factors. As such, it has pragmatic meaning and communicative power without being absolute in any way." According to Paul Harrison, the Diamond Sūtra's central argument here is that "all dharmas lack a self or essence, or to put it in other words, they have no core ontologically, they only appear to exist separately and independently by the power of conventional language, even though they are in fact dependently originated".

The mind of someone who practices the Prajñāpāramitā or "perfection of wisdom" is then a mind free from fixed substantialist or "self" concepts:

However, Lord, the idea of a self will not occur to them, nor will the idea of a living being, the idea of a soul, or the idea of a person occur. Why is that? Any such idea of a self is indeed idealess, any idea of a living being, idea of a soul, or idea of a person is indeed idealess. Why is that? Because the Buddhas and Lords are free of all ideas.

Throughout the teaching, the Buddha repeats that successful memorization and elucidation of even a four-line extract of it is of incalculable merit, better than giving an entire world system filled with gifts and can bring about enlightenment. Section 32 (of the Chinese version) also ends with a four-line gatha:

All conditioned phenomena
Are like a dream, an illusion, a bubble, a shadow,
Like dew or a flash of lightning; Thus we shall perceive them.

Paul Harrison's translation of the Sanskrit version states:

A shooting star, a clouding of the sight, a lamp,
An illusion, a drop of dew, a bubble,
A dream, a lightning's flash, a thunder cloud— This is the way one should see the conditioned.

Red Pine's translation about life showed that the text read:

So you should view this fleeting world—

A star at dawn, a bubble in a stream,
A flash of lightning in a summer cloud,

A flickering lamp, a phantom, and a dream.

== Dunhuang block print ==
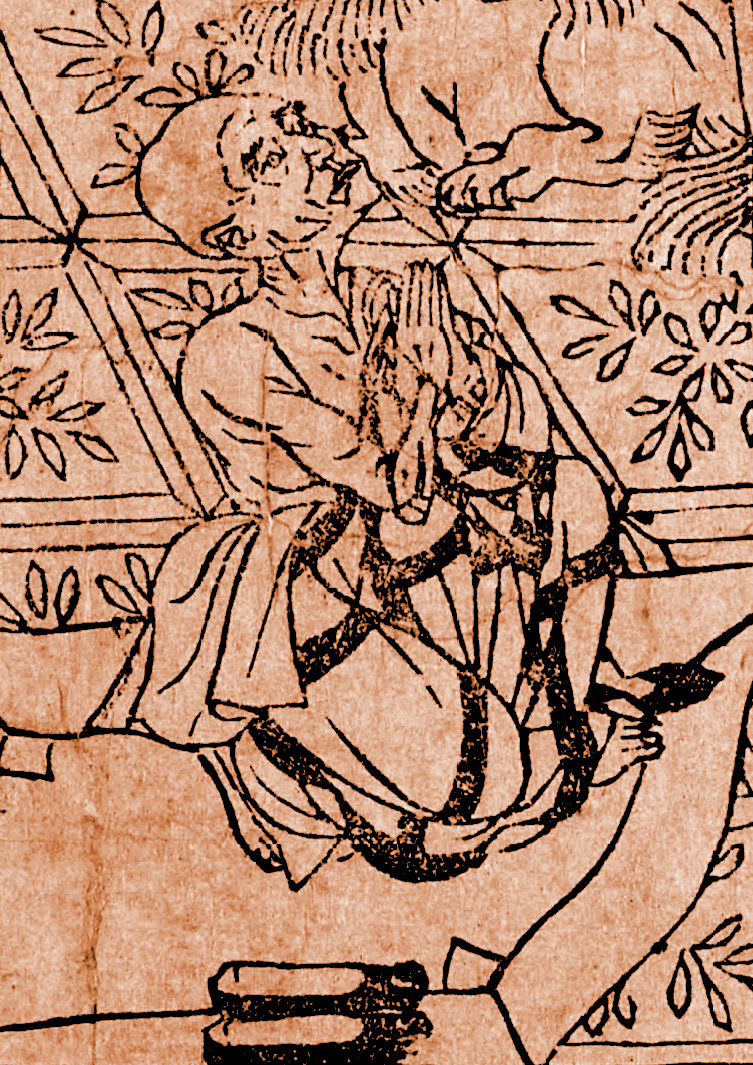
Elder Subhūti addresses the Buddha. Detail from the Dunhuang block print.

There is a woodblock-printed copy of the Diamond Sutra in the British Library which, although not the earliest example of block printing, is the earliest example which bears an actual date.

The extant copy is in the form of a scroll about five metres (16 ft) long. The archaeologist Sir Marc Aurel Stein purchased it in 1907 in the walled-up Mogao Caves near Dunhuang in northwestern China from a monk guarding the caves, known as the "Caves of the Thousand Buddhas".

The colophon, at the inner end, reads:

Reverently made for universal free distribution by Wang Jie on behalf of his two parents on the 15th day of the 4th month of the 9th year of Xiantong [11 May 868].

In 2010, the English writer and historian Frances Wood, the head of the Chinese section at the British Library; Mark Barnard, a conservator at the British Library; and Ken Seddon, a professor of chemistry at Queen's University, Belfast, were involved in the restoration of its copy of the book. The British Library website allows readers to view the Diamond Sūtra in its entirety.

== Selected English translations ==
Author	Title	Publisher	Notes	Year	ISBN
Max Müller	The Vagrakkhedika or diamond-cutter, in Buddhist Mahayana Texts (Sacred Books of the East), F. Max Muller et al.	Oxford University Press	Translation of the Vajracchedikā prajñāpāramitā from Sanskrit. Based on Muller's edition, the first Sanskrit edition published in the West, based on four Sanskrit manuscripts, one from Tibet, one from China, and two from Japan.	1894	
William Gemmell	The Diamond Sutra (Chin-kang-ching), or, Prajna-paramita	Kegan Paul, Trench, Trübner & Co.; Project Gutenberg	Translation of the Diamond Sutra from Chinese with an introduction and notes.	1912	
Daisetz Teitaro Suzuki	The Diamond Sutra	Various	Translation of the Diamond Sūtra	1934	
Edward Conze	Buddhist Wisdom: The Diamond Sutra and The Heart Sutra	George Allen & Unwin	The Diamond Sūtra and The Heart Sutra, along with commentaries on the texts and practices of Buddhism	1958	
Gregory Schopen	The Manuscript of the Vajracchedikā Found at Gilgit, in Studies in the Literature of the Great Vehicle: Three Mahāyāna Buddhist Texts, ed. by L. O. Gómez and J. A. Silk	Centers for South and Southeast Asia	Translation of the Diamond Sūtra from the Sanskrit Gilgit manuscript	1989	ISBN 978-0891480549
Thich Nhat Hanh	The Diamond that Cuts Through Illusion	Parallax Press	The Diamond Sūtra with a Vietnamese Thiền commentary	1992	ISBN 0-938077-51-1
Mu Soeng	The Diamond Sutra: Transforming the Way We Perceive the World	Wisdom Publications	Translation of the Diamond Sūtra with commentary	2000	ISBN 978-0861711604
Michael Roach	The Diamond Cutter, An Exalted Sutra of the Greater Way on the Perfection of Wisdom		Tibetan-English edition, translated from the Tibetan translation of Shilendra Bodhi.	2001	
Red Pine	The Diamond Sutra: The Perfection of Wisdom; Text and Commentaries Translated from Sanskrit and Chinese	Counterpoint	The Diamond Sūtra, translated from the Sanskrit (mostly from the editions by Max Muller and Edward Conze) with selections of Indian and Chán commentary from figures such as Asanga, Vasubandhu, Huineng, Linji and Chiang Wei-nung (1871–1938).	2001	ISBN 1-58243-256-2
Hsuan Hua	A General Explanation: The Vajra Prajna Paramita Sutra	Buddhist Text Translation Society		2002	ISBN 0881394300
Nan Huai-Chin	The Diamond Sutra Explained	Primodia Media		2004	ISBN 0-9716561-2-6
A.F. Price and Wong Mou-Lam	Diamond Sutra and the Sutra of Hui-neng	Shambhala Classics	Translation of the Diamond Sūtra and Platform Sutra	2005	ISBN 978-1590301371
Paul Harrison	Vajracchedikā Prajñāpāramitā: A New English Translation of the Sanskrit Text Based on Two Manuscripts from Greater Gandhāra	Hermes Publishing	Translation of the Diamond Sūtra from the Sanskrit (compiled from Gilgit and the Schøyen collection manuscripts)	2006	
Burton Watson	The Diamond Sutra	The Eastern Buddhist NEW SERIES, Vol. 41, No. 1	Translated and introduced by Watson, based on the modern Japanese annotated translation by NAKAMURA Hajime 中村元 and KINO Kazuyoshi 紀野一義 Hannya shingyō; Kongō hannyakyō (Tōkyō: Iwanami Shoten, 1960).	2010	
Young San Seong Do	The Diamond Sutra	Angkor Verlag	Translation of the Diamond Sūtra based on the Chinese text by Kumarajiva, including a glossary of Chinese and Sanskrit terms	2010	ISBN 978-3-936018-64-6

== See also ==
- Science and technology of the Tang dynasty
