= Roger Schmidt (academic) =

American academic

Roger Schmidt (c. 1931 – April 30, 2018) was an American academic who studied religion. He was the acting president of University of the West, a private, non profit, Buddhist-affiliated campus in Rosemead, California. He was replaced by Dr. Allen Huang in 2007.

Schmidt graduated from San Bernardino Valley College (1955), the University of Redlands (1957), and the Claremont Graduate University (1963) with degrees in philosophy, religion, and history. He taught philosophy and religious studies at San Bernardino Valley College from 1963-1993, including four years at Crafton Hills College (1987-1991), and chaired the Department of Philosophy and Religious Studies and the Social Science Division. He was a professor of religion, department chair, and Dean of Academic Affairs at the University of the West from 1991 to 2001 and was awarded an honorary doctorate by the University in 1998.

Schmidt is the author of Exploring Religion (1980, 1988), co-author of Patterns of Religion (1999, 2004), co-author of San Bernardino Valley College Sports, 1926-1996, co-author with his wife, Ann Schmidt, of an instructor's manual for Exploring Religion, and has published numerous articles, booklets, and book reviews. His academic posts have afforded him an opportunity to teach in London for a semester with the Southern California Foothills Colleges Consortium and the American Institute for Foreign Studies and to travel to Beijing to work on behalf of the University of the West.

Schmidt was a recipient of a National Endowment for the Humanities Fellowship to research "Images of Christ through Art," and co-produced with Ann Schmidt, "The Life of Christ through Art" and "Images of Christ in Art and Music." He was a member of a National Endowment for the Humanities panel in the "Exemplary Projects in Undergraduate and Graduate Education" program to evaluate grant proposals and was a member of the Project on the Study of Religion in Two-Year Colleges funded by the Charles E. Merrill Trust and administered by the American Academy of Religion and a contributor to its publication, The Study of Religion in Two-Year Colleges (1975).

Prior to his elevation as acting president, Schmidt was the UWest Dean of Academic Affairs. He died on April 30, 2018, at the age of 87.

Preceded by Dr. Lewis Lancaster	Acting UWest President; 2004 – 2007	Succeeded by Dr. Allen Huang
