= Lewis Lancaster =

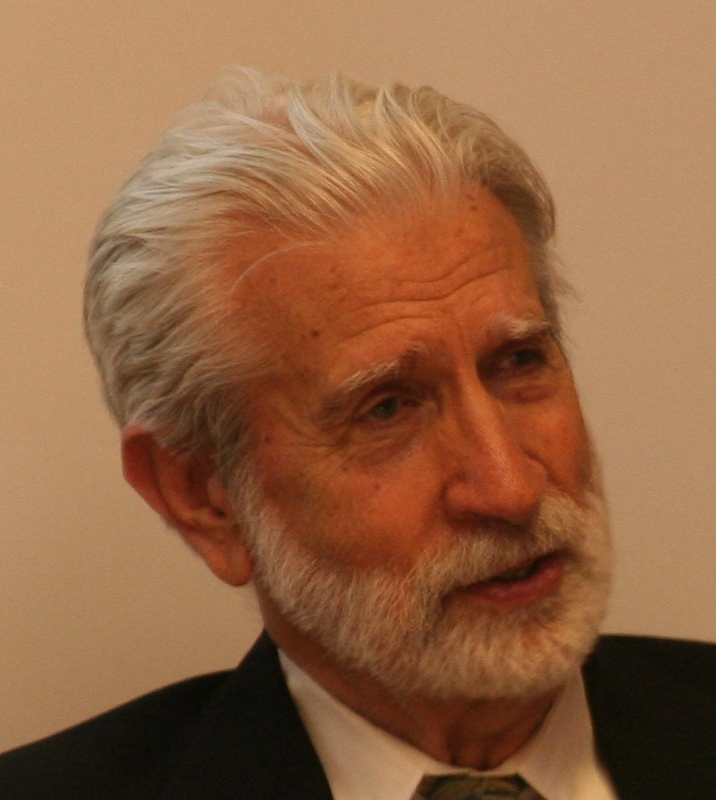
Professor Lancaster speaking in Australia, 2013

Lewis R. Lancaster (born 29 October 1932) is Professor Emeritus of Buddhist Studies at the University of California, Berkeley, US, and has served as president and professor emeritus at University of the West since 1992.

== Early life ==
Lancaster graduated from Roanoke College (B.A.) in 1954 and received an honorary Doctorate of Letters from Roanoke in 2007. He is also a 1958 graduate of USC-ST (M.Th.) and a 1968 graduate of the University of Wisconsin (Ph.D.). He received an honorary Doctorate of Buddhist Studies from Vietnam Buddhist University in 2011.

== Academic career ==
In 1971, Lancaster established the Group in Buddhist Studies at the University of California, Berkeley. He served as the founding Chair of the Group in Buddhist Studies and as the Editor of the Berkeley Buddhist Studies Series.

In the fall of 1977, Lancaster accompanied artist and monk Jung-kwang as they traveled through Korea, and published a book based on their trip.

Lancaster has published over 55 articles and reviews and has edited or authored numerous books including Prajnaparamita and Related Systems, The Korean Buddhist Canon, Buddhist Scriptures, Early Ch’an in China and Tibet, and Assimilation of Buddhism in Korea. He also founded the Electronic Cultural Atlas Initiative to use the computer-based technology to map the spread of Buddhism from the remote past to the present.

In 2008 Lancaster gave the Burke Lectureship on Religion & Society.

Lancaster is the research adviser for the Buddha's Birthday Education Project, which has documented and hosted art exhibitions of the celebration of the Buddha's birthday in Chinese Buddhism throughout history.

== Korean Buddhist Canon ==
Lancaster was a key figure in the creation of descriptive catalogue and digitization of the Korean Buddhist Canon. He was awarded the 2014 Grand Award from the Korean Buddhist Order for his contribution to Buddhism.
