= Buddhism by country =

Percentage of Buddhists by country in 2010, according to the Pew Research Center

This list shows the distribution of the Buddhist religion, practiced by about 320 million people, representing 4.1% of the world's total population as of 2020. By sheer numbers, Thailand accounts for the largest portion of the global Buddhist population. It is the state religion in three countries — Cambodia, Bhutan and Sri Lanka. Pew Research Center stated that Buddhism was the only religion to have declined in their 2010 to 2020 report covering the global religious landscape.

Mahayana, the largest branch of Buddhism, is followed by around 53% of Buddhists, mainly centered in East Asia whereas the second-largest branch Theravada is mostly followed in Mainland Southeast Asia and Sri Lanka with around 36% population as of 2010. Other smaller schools such as Navayana are scantly followed in India.

== By country ==
=== Ten countries with the largest Buddhist populations ===
Countries with the largest Buddhist populations as of 2020, according to Pew Research Center
Country	Estimated Buddhist population	% of Buddhist share of the country's population	% of world Buddhist population
Thailand	67,620,000	94.4%	20.9%
China	53,380,000	3.7%	16.5%
Myanmar	47,210,000	89.1%	14.6%
Japan	46,990,000	37.2%	14.5%
Vietnam	22,580,000	23.0%	7.0%
Cambodia	16,240,000	97.1%	5.0%
Sri Lanka	15,700,000	69.6%	4.8%
South Korea	9,850,000	19.0%	3.0%
India	9,550,000	0.7%	2.9%
Malaysia	6,400,000	18.9%	2.0%
Subtotal for the ten countries	295,530,000	8.9%^{a}	91.2%
Subtotal for the rest of the world	28,660,000	0.6%^{b}	8.8%
World total	324,190,000	4.1%	100%

^{a} (% of total of all ten countries)

^{b} (% of rest of world population)

=== Buddhist population by country in 2010 (Pew Research Center) ===
Buddhist population by country (Pew Research Center)
Country/Territory	Population	% Buddhist	No. of Buddhists
Afghanistan	31,410,000	< 0.1%	< 10,000
Albania	3,200,000	< 0.1%	< 10,000
Algeria	35,470,000	< 0.1%	< 10,000
American Samoa	70,000	0.3%	< 10,000
Andorra	80,000	< 0.1%	< 10,000
Angola	19,080,000	< 0.1%	< 10,000
Argentina	40,410,000	< 0.1%	20,000
Armenia	3,090,000	< 0.1%	< 10,000
Aruba	110,000	0.1%	< 10,000
Australia	22,270,000	2.7%	600,000
Austria	8,390,000	0.2%	20,000
Azerbaijan	9,190,000	< 0.1%	< 10,000
Bahamas	340,000	< 0.1%	< 10,000
Bahrain	1,260,000	2.5%	30,000
Bangladesh	148,690,000	0.6%	1,001,000
Barbados	270,000	< 0.1%	< 10,000
Belarus	9,600,000	< 0.1%	< 10,000
Belgium	10,710,000	0.2%	30,000
Belize	310,000	0.5%	< 10,000
Benin	8,850,000	< 0.1%	< 10,000
Bermuda	60,000	0.5%	< 10,000
Bhutan	730,000	74.7%	540,000
Bolivia	9,930,000	< 0.1%	< 10,000
Botswana	2,010,000	< 0.1%	< 10,000
Brazil	194,950,000	0.1%	250,000
Brunei	400,000	8.6%	30,000
Bulgaria	7,490,000	< 0.1%	< 10,000
Burkina Faso	16,470,000	< 0.1%	< 10,000
Cambodia	14,140,000	96.9%	13,690,000
Cameroon	19,600,000	< 0.1%	< 10,000
Canada	34,020,000	0.8%	280,000
Chad	11,230,000	< 0.1%	< 10,000
Chile	17,110,000	< 0.1%	10,000
China	1,341,340,000	18.2%	244,130,000
Colombia	46,290,000	< 0.1%	< 10,000
Democratic Republic of the Congo	65,970,000	< 0.1%	< 10,000
Republic of the Congo	4,040,000	< 0.1%	< 10,000
Costa Rica	4,660,000	< 0.1%	< 10,000
(Ivory Coast) Côte d'Ivoire	19,740,000	< 0.1%	< 10,000
Croatia	4,400,000	< 0.1%	< 10,000
Cuba	11,260,000	< 0.1%	< 10,000
Cyprus	1,100,000	0.2%	< 10,000
Czech Republic	10,490,000	< 0.1%	< 10,000
Denmark	5,550,000	0.2%	10,000
Dominica	70,000	0.1%	< 10,000
Dominican Republic	9,930,000	< 0.1%	< 10,000
Ecuador		< 0.1%	< 10,000
Egypt		< 0.1%	< 10,000
El Salvador		< 0.1%	< 10,000
Estonia		< 0.1%	< 10,000
Ethiopia		< 0.1%	?
Falkland Islands		< 0.1%	?
Federated States of Micronesia	110,000	0.4%	< 10,000
Fiji		< 0.1%	< 10,000
Finland		< 0.1%	< 10,000
France	62,790,000	0.5%	280,000
French Guiana		< 0.1%	< 10,000
French Polynesia		< 0.1%	< 10,000
Germany	82,300,000	0.3%	210,000
Ghana		< 0.1%	< 10,000
Greece		< 0.1%	< 10,000
Guam	180,000	1.1%	< 10,000
Guatemala		< 0.1%	< 10,000
Guinea		< 0.1%	< 10,000
Guyana		< 0.1%	< 10,000
Haiti		< 0.1%	< 10,000
Honduras	7,600,000	0.1%	< 10,000
Hong Kong	7,050,000	13.2%	930,000
Hungary		< 0.1%	< 10,000
Iceland	320,000	0.4%	< 10,000
India	1,224,610,000	0.8%	9,250,000
Indonesia	266,535,000	0.71%	2,062,150
Iran		< 0.1%	< 10,000
Iraq		< 0.1%	< 10,000
Ireland	4,470,000	0.2%	< 10,000
Israel	7,420,000	0.3%	20,000
Italy	60,550,000	0.2%	110,000
Jamaica	2,740,000	< 0.1%	< 10,000
Japan	126,540,000	36.2%	45,820,000
Jordan	6,190,000	0.4%	20,000
Kazakhstan	16,030,000	0.2%	40,000
Kenya		< 0.1%	< 10,000
North Korea	24,350,000	1.5%	370,000
South Korea	48,180,000	22.9%	11,050,000
Kuwait	2,740,000	2.8%	80,000
Kyrgyzstan		< 0.1%	< 10,000
Laos	6,200,000	66.1%	4,100,000
Latvia		< 0.1%	< 10,000
Lebanon	4,230,000	0.2%	< 10,000
Lesotho		< 0.1%	< 10,000
Liberia		< 0.1%	< 10,000
Libya	6,360,000	0.3%	20,000
Liechtenstein		< 0.1%	< 10,000
Lithuania		< 0.1%	< 10,000
Luxembourg		< 0.1%	< 10,000
Macau	540,000	17.3%	90,000
Madagascar		< 0.1%	< 10,000
Malawi		< 0.1%	< 10,000
Malaysia	28,400,000	19.8%	5,010,000
Maldives	320,000	0.6%	< 10,000
Mali		< 0.1%	< 10,000
Malta		< 0.1%	< 10,000
Martinique		< 0.1%	< 10,000
Mauritius		< 0.1%	< 10,000
Mexico		< 0.1%	< 10,000
Mongolia	2,760,000	55.1%	1,520,000
Montenegro		< 0.1%	< 10,000
Morocco		< 0.1%	< 10,000
Mozambique		< 0.1%	< 10,000
Myanmar (Burma)	47,960,000	89.9%	38,410,000
Namibia		< 0.1%	< 10,000
Nauru	10,000	1.1%	< 10,000
Nepal	29,960,000	10.3%	2,420,000
Netherlands	16,610,000	0.2%	40,000
New Caledonia	250,000	0.6%	< 10,000
New Zealand	4,370,000	1.1%	52,779
Nicaragua		< 0.1%	< 10,000
Nigeria	158,420,000	< 0.1%	10,000
North Macedonia		< 0.1%	< 10,000
Northern Mariana Islands	60,000	10.6%	< 10,000
Norway	4,880,000	0.6%	30,000
Oman	2,780,000	0.8%	20,000
Pakistan	173,590,000	< 0.1%	20,000
Palau	20,000	0.8%	< 10,000
Palestine		< 0.1%	< 10,000
Panama	3,520,000	0.2%	< 10,000
Papua New Guinea		< 0.1%	< 10,000
Paraguay		< 0.1%	< 10,000
Peru	29,080,000	0.2%	50,000
Philippines	93,260,000	< 0.1%	40,000
Poland		< 0.1%	< 10,000
Portugal	10,680,000	0.6%	60,000
Puerto Rico	3,750,000	0.3%	10,000
Qatar	1,760,000	3.1%	50,000
Réunion	850,000	0.2%	< 10,000
Romania		< 0.1%	< 10,000
Russia	142,960,000	0.1%	170,000
Saudi Arabia	27,450,000	0.3%	90,000
Senegal	12,430,000	0.3%	< 10,000
Serbia		< 0.1%	< 10,000
Seychelles		< 0.1%	< 10,000
Sierra Leone	5,870,000	0.3%	< 10,000
Singapore	5,090,000	33.9%	1,730,000
Slovakia		< 0.1%	< 10,000
Slovenia		< 0.1%	< 10,000
Solomon Islands	540,000	0.3%	< 10,000
South Africa	50,130,000	0.2%	100,000
Spain		< 0.1%	< 10,000
Sri Lanka	20,860,000	69.3%	14,450,000
Sudan		< 0.1%	< 10,000
Suriname	520,000	0.6%	< 10,000
(Eswatini) Swaziland		< 0.1%	< 10,000
Sweden	9,380,000	0.4%	40,000
Switzerland	7,660,000	0.4%	30,000
Taiwan	23,220,000	21.3%	4,950,000
Tajikistan		< 0.1%	< 10,000
Tanzania		< 0.1%	< 10,000
Thailand	69,120,000	93.2%	64,420,000
Togo		< 0.1%	< 10,000
Tonga	100,000	< 0.1%	< 10,000
Tunisia		< 0.1%	< 10,000
Trinidad and Tobago	1,340,000	0.3%	< 10,000
Turkey	72,750,000	< 0.1%	40,000
Turkmenistan		< 0.1%	< 10,000
Tuvalu		< 0.1%	< 10,000
Uganda		< 0.1%	< 10,000
Ukraine	45,450,000	< 0.1%	20,000
United Arab Emirates	7,510,000	2.0%	150,000
United Kingdom	62,040,000	0.4%	240,000
United States	310,380,000	1.2%	3,570,000
Uruguay		< 0.1%	< 10,000
(United States Virgin Islands) US Virgin Islands		< 0.1%	< 10,000
Uzbekistan	27,440,000	< 0.1%	< 10,000
Vanuatu		< 0.1%	< 10,000
Venezuela		< 0.1%	< 10,000
Vietnam	87,850,000	16.4%	14,380,000
Yemen		< 0.1%	< 10,000
Zambia		< 0.1%	< 10,000
Zimbabwe		< 0.1%	< 10,000
World	6,895,890,000	7.1%	487,540,000

=== Buddhist population by country (Other data) ===
Buddhist population by country (Other data)
Country/territory	Population	% Buddhist	No. of Buddhists	Year	Source
Argentina	47,327,407			2022	National census
Australia	25,422,788	2.4%	615,800	2021	National census
Bangladesh	165,158,616	0.61%		2022	National census
Belgium		0.3%		2018	Other
Bhutan	735,553			2017	National census
Cambodia		97.9%		2013	Other
Canada		1.1%	366,830	2011	Census
China		4%	42,000,000	2023	Studies
Costa Rica		2.34%	100,000	2012	Other
Denmark		1.1%	64,000	2018	Other
Germany			270,000	2016	Other
India	1,210,854,977	0.7%	8,442,972	2011	National census
Italy		0.3%	160,000		Caritas Italiana
Japan		67.0%	84,336,539	2018	ACA Religious Yearbook
Japan		67.2%		2020	CIA Factbook
Kuwait		4.0%	100,000	2006	Other
Macau		80.0%	455,000	2012	Government report
Mongolia		Up to 93.0%			Other
Myanmar	50,279,900	89.8%	45,185,449	2014	National census
New Zealand	5,034,906	1.2%	60.419	2022	National census
Oman		1.2%	30,501		Other
Philippines			1,861,600		Other
Russia		0.6%	866,500	2016	Other
Saudi Arabia		1.5%	414,016	2007	Other
Singapore	4,044,210	31.1%	1,257,749	2020	National census
Sri Lanka	20,359,439	70.2%	14,272,056	2011	National census
Sweden		0.7%	57,064	2020	Other
Taiwan		35.0%	8,050,000	2006	Other
Thailand	67,706,048	93.5%	63,299,193	2018	National census
Thailand		94.5%	63,620,298	2015	Census
United Arab Emirates		5.0%	222,201	2006	Other
United States	337,886,853	1.5%	5,068,303	2022	National census
Vietnam		Up to 66.7%			Other

== By region ==
Buddhism by region in 2010
Region	Estimated total population	Estimated Buddhist population	%
Asia-Pacific	4,054,990,000	481,290,000	11.9%
North America	344,530,000	3,860,000	1.1%
Europe	742,550,000	1,330,000	0.2%
Middle East-North Africa	341,020,000	500,000	0.1%
Latin America-Caribbean	590,080,000	410,000	<0.1%
Total	6,895,890,000	487,540,000	7.1%

== See also ==
- Buddhism in Southeast Asia
- Buddhism in the West
- Buddhism and Eastern religions
- East Asian Buddhism

General:

- List of religious populations
- Religions by country
