= Buddhism in the Americas =

Buddhism in the Americas may refer to:

- Buddhism in North America:
  - Buddhism in Canada
  - Buddhism in Mexico
  - Buddhism in the United States
- Buddhism in the Caribbean:
  - Buddhism in Cuba
- Buddhism in Central America:
  - Buddhism in Costa Rica
  - Buddhism in Nicaragua
- Buddhism in South America:
  - Buddhism in Argentina
  - Buddhism in Brazil
  - Buddhism in Chile
  - Buddhism in Ecuador
  - Buddhism in Paraguay
  - Buddhism in Peru
  - Buddhism in Uruguay
  - Buddhism in Venezuela

== See also ==
- South America Hongwanji Mission
- Index of Buddhism-related articles
- List of American Buddhists
- Secular Buddhism
- Template:Buddhism by country
