= Buddhism in Africa =

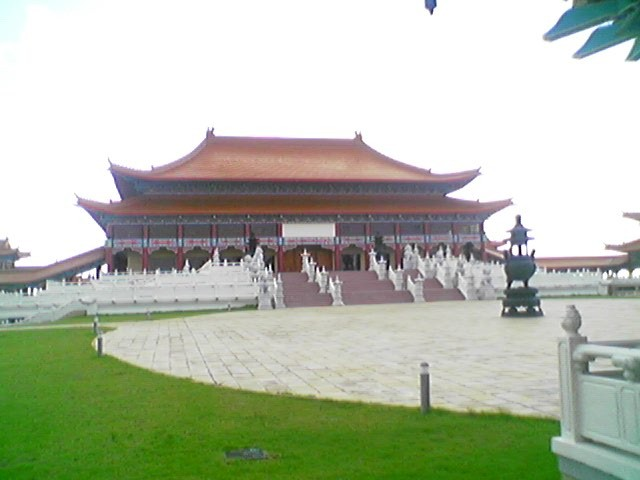
Nan Hua Temple in Bronkhorstspruit, South Africa is the largest Buddhist pagoda in Africa.

Buddhism is practised throughout Africa. Though there have been some conversions amongst Africans, the majority of Buddhists in Africa are of Asian descent, primarily of Chinese, Vietnamese, Sri Lankan or Japanese descent.

South Africa holds the largest Buddhist population in the continent. According to estimates in the 2010s, Buddhist adherents (together with Taoism and Chinese Folk Religion) had been increasing there to between 0.2% or 0.3% of the South African population, or between 100 and 150 thousand people, however, the number of practising Buddhists may be lower.

The African countries and territories in the Indian Ocean also have significant Buddhist minorities. Mauritius has the highest Buddhist percentage (between 1.5 to 2% of the total population) among African countries due to a high number of Chinese people (nearly 40 thousand or 3% of the Mauritian population). However, practicing Buddhists approximately comprise only about 0.4% of the population. Madagascar is also home of about 20 thousand Buddhists, about 0.1% of the total population. In the Seychelles and Réunion, Buddhists represent nearly 0.1% to 0.2% of the population.

In North Africa, about 0.3% (roughly 20 thousand people) of Libya's population are also Buddhists, with most of them being foreign workers from Asia. There are also two Buddhist centers in Casablanca, Morocco.

Buddhist centers and temples can be found in many Sub-Saharan African countries such as: Botswana, Cameroon, Ghana, Guinea, Ivory Coast, Kenya, Lesotho, Liberia, Malawi, Mali, Namibia, Nigeria, Senegal, Sierra Leone, Swaziland, Tanzania, Togo, Uganda, Zambia, and Zimbabwe.

There have also been cases of some high-profile celebrities converting to Buddhism such as Adewale Akinnuoye-Agbaje, a famous British actor of Nigerian descent.

One of the very few monastics of African descent is Ven. Bhante Buddharakkhita from Uganda, founder of the Uganda Buddhist Centre.

== History ==
Evidence of Buddhism in Africa dates back to the Roman era. A 2nd century Buddha statue made of marble and presumed to have been made in Alexandria was found at Berenike in Egypt.

== Buddhist population by country ==
| Countries/Territories | Practicing Buddhism (2010's estimates) | Chinese Folk Religions (2010's estimates) | Combined numbers |
|---|---|---|---|
Eastern Africa
| Burundi | - | - | - |
| Comoros | - | - | - |
| Djibouti | - | - | - |
| Eritrea | - | - | - |
| Ethiopia | 1,327 | - | 1,327 |
| Kenya | 1,276 | 1,945 | 3,221 |
| Madagascar | 5,178 | 10,357 | 15,535 |
| Malawi | available | - | - |
| Mauritius | 3,222 | 17,292 | 20,514 |
| Mayotte (France) | - | - | - |
| Mozambique | 2,035 | 4,341 | 6,376 |
| Réunion (France) | 1,570 | - | 1,570 |
| Rwanda | - | - | - |
| Seychelles | available | available | - |
| Somalia | - | - | - |
| South Sudan | - | - | - |
| Tanzania | 10,157 | 23,699 | 33,856 |
| Uganda | 2,005 | 4,278 | 6,283 |
| Zambia | 3,927 | 8,377 | 12,304 |
| Zimbabwe | 189 | 402 | 591 |
Central Africa
| Angola | 1,632 | 162 | 1,794 |
| Cameroon | 353 | 753 | 1,106 |
| Central African Republic | - | - | - |
| Chad | 1,684 | 3,593 | 5,277 |
| Republic of the Congo | - | 283 | 283 |
| Democratic Republic of the Congo | 3,734 | - | - |
| Equatorial Guinea | - | - | - |
| Gabon | - | - | - |
| São Tomé and Príncipe | - | - | - |
Northern Africa
| Algeria | 5,320 | 11,350 | 16,670 |
| Egypt | 1,687 | - | - |
| Libya | 20,209 | 1,773 | 21,982 |
| Morocco | available | - | - |
| Sudan | 982 | 2,094 | 3,076 |
| Tunisia | 79 | 168 | 247 |
| Western Sahara | - | - | - |
Southern Africa
| Botswana | 1,120 | 111 | 1,231 |
| Lesotho | available | - | - |
| Namibia | available | - | - |
| South Africa | 159,220 | 35,589 | 194,809 |
| Swaziland | available | - | - |
Western Africa
| Benin | - | - | - |
| Burkina Faso | available | - | - |
| Cape Verde | - | - | - |
| Gambia | - | - | - |
| Ghana | 488 | 707 | 1,195 |
| Guinea | 8,983 | - | - |
| Guinea-Bissau | - | - | - |
| Ivory Coast | 9,869 | - | - |
| Liberia | available | - | - |
| Mali | available |
| Mauritania | - | - | - |
| Niger | - | - | - |
| Nigeria | 8,458 | 4,675 | 13,133 |
| Senegal | 1,679 | 398 | 2,057 |
| Sierra Leone | available |
| Togo | available | - | - |
| Africa | 256,383 | 132,348 | 388,731 |

== See also ==
- Buddhism in Libya
- Buddhism in Senegal
- Buddhism in South Africa
- Buddhism in Morocco
- The Uganda Buddhist Centre
- Tanzania Buddhist Temple and Meditation Center
- Index of Buddhism-related articles
