= Buddhism in Argentina =

- Flag of Argentina

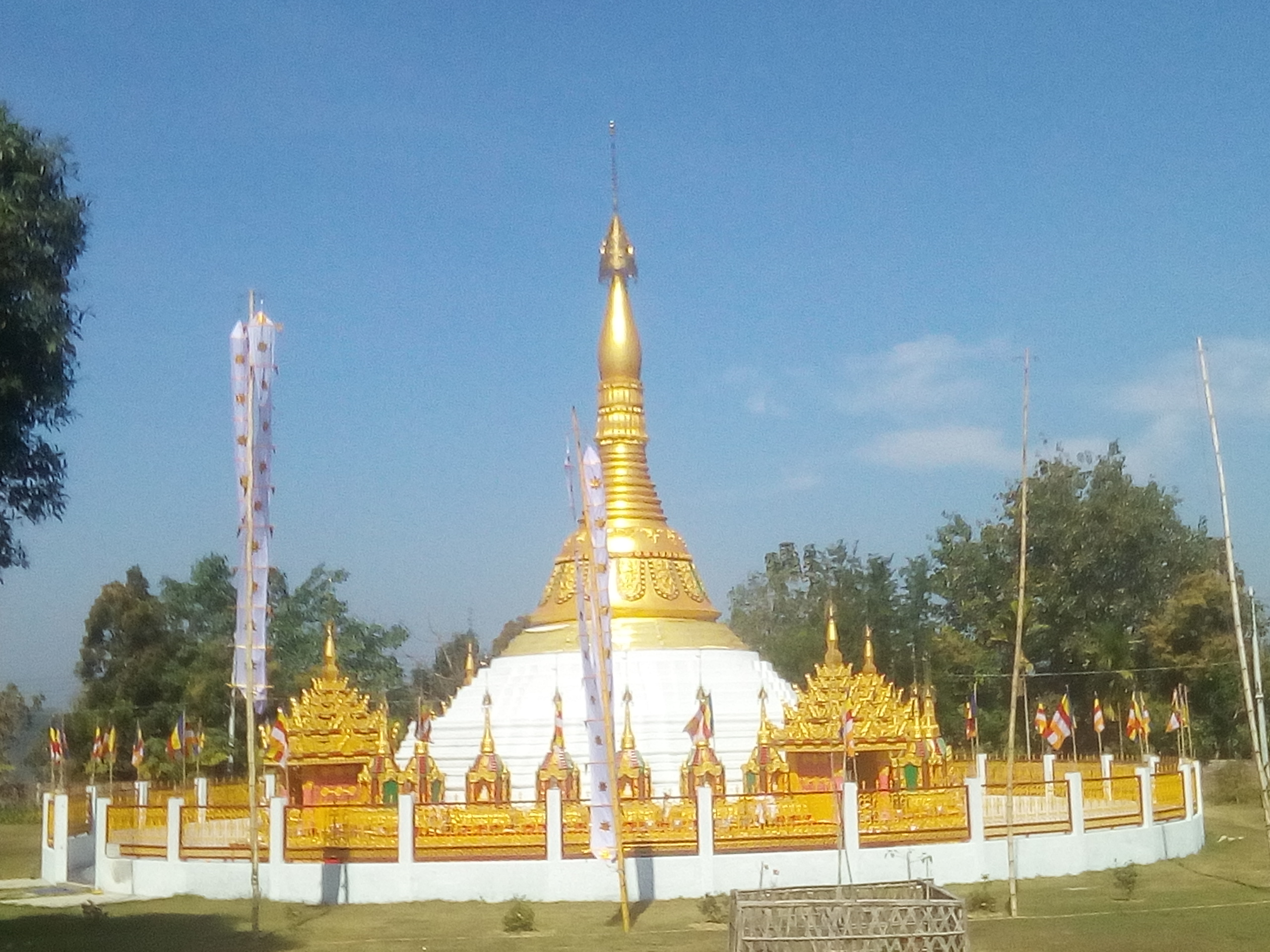
- Haei Sau Buddhist Temple in Buenos Aires

Total population
- c. 35000 – c. 40000 (0.5%)

Regions with significant populations
- Throughout Argentina

Religions
- Tibetan Buddhism, Mahayana, Theravada

Scriptures
- Pali canon

Languages
- Spanish and others

Buddhism is a minority religion in Argentina, where, in addition to the majority of the Christian population, the rate of self-professed Buddhists is about 0.5%.

Buddhism in Argentina has been practiced since the early 1980s. Chinese Buddhist immigrants had established their first Buddhist temple in 1986, and Korean Buddhist immigrants also founded their own temple. Since then, many groups have been giving teachings, some of them rooted in the Sōtō tradition from Japan, but also in many Tibetan institutes for the practice of meditation (Mahamudra, Dzog Chen, Lam Rim).

Nowadays, many Buddhist centres have flourished and propagated widely. Buenos Aires is home to about 5,000 immigrant Buddhists and 25,000 Buddhist converts.

Many organizations have cooperated to bring relics of the Buddha to Argentina. This event was supported by the Royal Embassy of Thailand in Buenos Aires.

Among scholars who contributed to the spreading of Buddhism in Argentina are Samuel Wolpin, whose books have opened a door to many students and the general public, and Carmen Dragonetti and Fernando Tola, who have been researching and studying Buddhism for many years, with their books translated to many languages.

Teachers who have visited the country include Pu Hsien, founder of the Tzong Kuan Temple, Mok Sunim, responsible for spreading of Korean Buddhism in the early twenty-first century, Chogyal Namkhai Norbu, founder of the international Dzog Chen Community who transmitted Dzog Chen teachings here, and Lama Ngawang Sherab Dorje, who visited Argentina many times. Local teachers include Augusto Alcalde (Diamond Sangha) the first Roshi in this country. Jorge Bustamante, Soto lineage. Alberto Pulisi (Upasaka). Gonzalo Barreiros (Dharma Teacher), and two Argentine lamas, Horacio and Consuelo.

== Japanese Zen Buddhism ==
There are about seven Japanese Zen Buddhism institutions which has a total of around five thousand practitioners. One of them, Zen Deshimaru Buddhist Association, was formed in 1995 and is led by Soto Zen priest Stephane "Kosen" Thibaut who performed missionary works in Argentina and other Latin American countries. In the mid-1990s, he began visiting Argentina, guiding meditation retreats, and establishing dojos. The organization is the biggest Zen order in the country, established about nineteen dojos across the country and Shobogenji Temple which is situated on Mount Uritorco in Cordoba Province.

== Chinese Buddhism ==
Tzong Kuan Temple was founded in 1988 by Master Pu Hsien with the support of Buddhist community in Taiwan, the temple is located in the Belgrano area on Montañeses 2175 Street and has a branch temple in Brazil. The current abbot is Master Zhi Han and the temple is also affiliated to Chinese Buddhist Association in Argentina and Bodhiyana Foundation.

Fo Guang Shan Order from Taiwan also has had a branch temple, "Templo Budista Fo Guang Shan," in Argentina since 1992, and the temple has offered courses in meditation, martial arts, and yoga and hosts vegetarian cooking workshops on a regular basis.

== Theravada Buddhism ==
There is a Vipassanā meditation community founded by Eduardo Torres Astigueta, it is known as "Vipassana Buenos Aires" and they conduct weekly practices in Palermo and Flores. In 2005, the Argentinean Vipassana Association acquired a piece of land located in the outskirts of Brandsen in Buenos Aires Province and built the Dhamma Sukhadā Center which means "Giving the Happiness of Dhamma" with a capacity of 120 students.

== See also ==
- South America Hongwanji Mission
- Buddhism in Brazil
- Buddhism in Colombia
- Buddhism in Venezuela
- Buddhism in Ecuador
- Buddhism in Costa Rica
- Buddhism in Nicaragua
- Buddhism in Mexico
- Buddhism in Canada
- Buddhism in Uruguay
- Buddhism in the United States
- Buddhism in Central America
- Asian Argentines
