= Buddhism in Venezuela =

Buddhism in Venezuela is practiced by very approximately 52,000 people (roughly 0.2% of the population) as of 2015. The Buddhist community is made up mainly of Chinese, Japanese, and Koreans.

Most identify with the Mahayana tradition, reflecting the religious heritage of their emigrant countries.

However, in the mid-1990s Keun-Tshen Goba (né Ezequiel Hernandez Urdaneta), together with Jigme Rinzen, and under the guidance of Chugai Keisho (German financier né Burkhard Brauch), also a former disciple of Chögyam Trungpa founded a meditation center using the Shambhala Training method.

There are Buddhist centers in Caracas, Maracay, Mérida, Puerto Ordáz, San Felipe, and Valencia.

== See also ==
- Buddhism in Brazil
- Buddhism in Argentina
- Buddhism in Costa Rica
- Buddhism in Nicaragua
- Buddhism in Mexico
- Buddhism in Canada
- Buddhism in Uruguay
- Buddhism in the United States
- Buddhism in Central America
- Buddhism by country
