= Buddhism in Mexico =

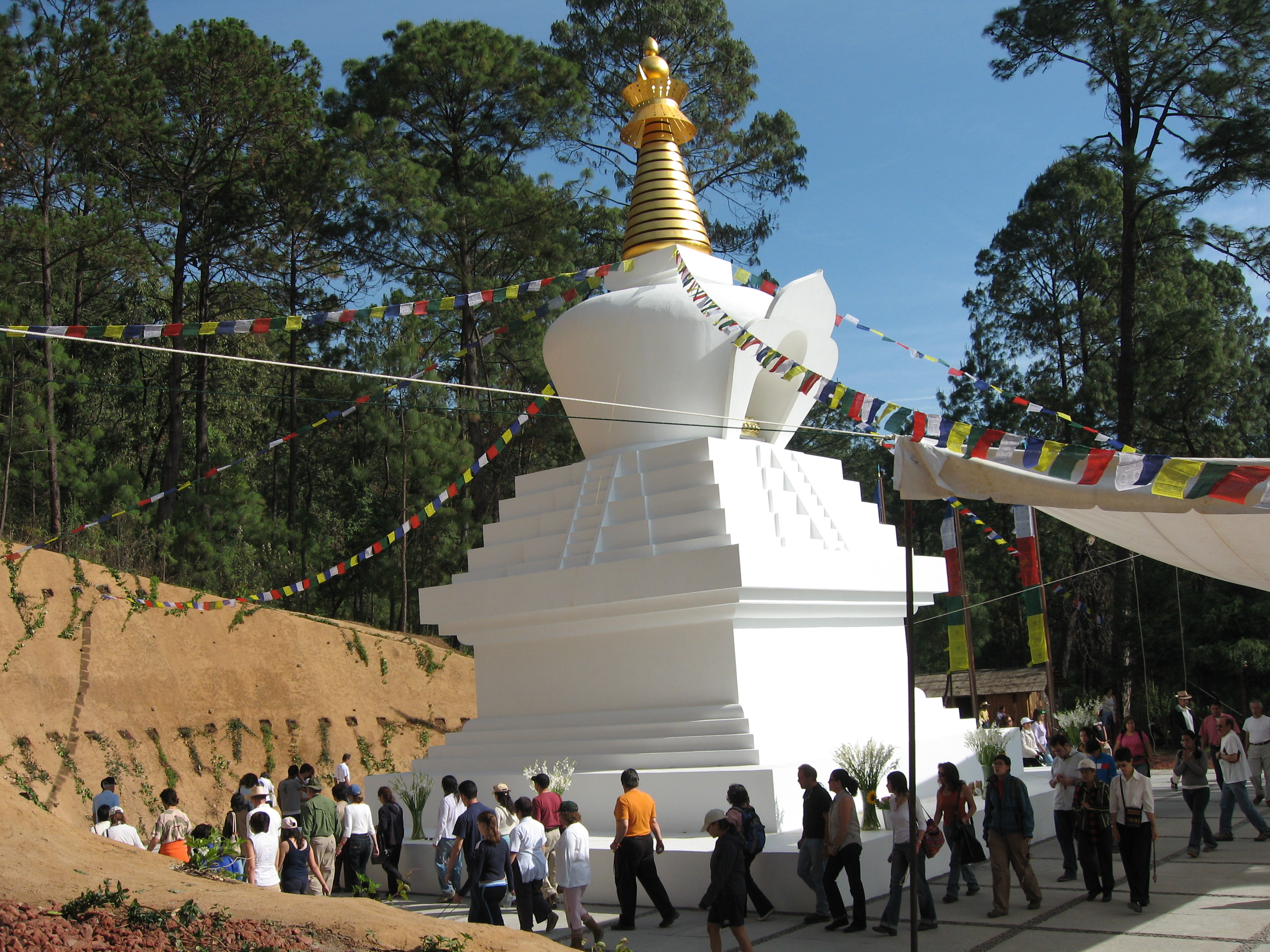
A Tibetan Buddhist ritual in Valle de Bravo.

Buddhism is a minority religion in Mexico, numbering 108,701 followers or 0.09% of the total Mexican population. According to the General Directorate of Religious Affairs of the Secretariat of the Interior, twelve Buddhist religious associations are registered in the country. Buddhism first reached Mexico at the end of the nineteenth century, introduced by scientists and academics and later by intellectuals such as Amado Nervo.

== Theravada Buddhism ==
The Theravada tradition, the oldest of the Buddhist schools, arrived in Mexico through two main streams: the Burmese tradition of the Mahasi lineage, which established the country's Theravada monasteries, and the Thai meditation tradition of Ajahn Tong Sirimangalo, which spread through lay Vipassana centres. According to the Buddhistdoor article on the Mexican sangha, there are two Theravada monasteries in the country and three stupas, with meditation retreat sites in Baja California, Morelos, Michoacán and Veracruz.

=== Burmese tradition (Mahasi lineage) ===
The first Theravada monastery in the country, and the first in the Spanish-speaking world, was Dhamma Vihāra, founded on 30 January 1999 in Jilotepec, Veracruz, under the spiritual guidance of the Burmese monk U Sīlānanda and the Argentine-born monk Bhikkhu Nandisena, who serves as its abbot. The monastery is administered by the religious association Buddhismo Theravada México/Hispano AR, registered with the Secretariat of the Interior (SGAR 2860/2006). A Buddhist stupa, the SantiSukha project, is planned on the monastery's grounds.

Bhikkhu Nandisena is known for his Spanish translations of the Abhidhammattha Saṅgaha (1999) and of the Dhammapada with Buddhaghosa's commentary (2008), and has served as Mexico's representative to the World Buddhist Council. The Instituto de Estudios Buddhistas Hispano (IEBH), an academic institution founded in Mexico City in 2011 and affiliated with the International Association of Buddhist Universities, is associated with the same community and offers courses on Pali and Buddhist studies. The Centro Mexicano del Buddhismo Theravada, one of the earliest Theravada organizations in Mexico, was also founded by U Sīlānanda in the 1990s.

In the Guadalajara metropolitan area, the Paññābhūmi Monastery in Zapopan was founded by the Mexican monk Bhante Rāhula, a disciple of Sayadaw U Tejaniya of the Shwe Oo Min lineage, who teaches in Spanish, English and Portuguese to students in eighteen countries. The Singapore-based Buddhist organization Firefly Mission began supporting the monastery in 2023. Rāhula is also one of the promoters of the Foro Buddhista Theravāda Latino (theravada.lat), a network of monastics and Theravada community leaders in Latin America.

=== Thai tradition (Ajahn Tong lineage) ===
The meditation tradition of Ajahn Tong Sirimangalo, of Wat Phra That Si Chom Thong in northern Thailand, reached Mexico through Virginia Gurza Ayón, known as Khun Chakkaratani (1954–2022), who met Ajahn Tong in Thailand in 1984 and became his disciple and representative in Mexico. Chakkaratani organized Ajahn Tong's first visit to Mexico, during which he led the first Vipassana retreats in the country in 1985, and in 1989, during his second visit, she received the name Chakkaratani ("the jewel of the Teaching") and authorization to teach as his representative. She founded the Casa de Meditación Vipassana and taught for over thirty years, receiving in 2012 the "Sao Sema Dhammacakka" award from Princess Maha Chakri Sirindhorn of Thailand for spreading the Dhamma.

Miguel Pelusi, born in Mexico City, is the director of Anumodana, the Spanish-speaking branch of Ajahn Tong's school, and president of the association of Thai Buddhist meditators in Mexico, Spain and Central and South America. He has devoted some forty years to the study of Buddhism and Vipassana meditation under the guidance of Ajahn Tong, began the study of the Abhidhamma under U Sīlānanda in 1993, and in 1999 received at Wat Phra That Si Chom Thong the title of lay instructor, issued by the ecclesiastical director of the northern region of Thailand. He leads retreats in Mexico, Spain, Colombia and Argentina.

In 2012 Pelusi was honoured at Wat Phra That Si Chom Thong for founding the first Vipassana centre of the tradition outside Thailand and for his missionary work in Spain, Colombia and Mexico. The Spanish Vipassana centre Casa Betania, where Pelusi leads retreats, describes him as the tradition's representative in Latin America and Spain and states that he received recognition from the queen and the government of Thailand for spreading Buddhism in the West.

== Tibetan Buddhism ==
Casa Tibet México (headquartered in the Colonia Roma of Mexico City) was the third of the Tibet Houses to be created. It was founded by the XIV Dalai Lama on his first visit to Mexico. One of the main objectives of the Casa Tibet is to combat the esoteric New Age beliefs that surround eastern cosmogony and to disseminate and preserve true Tibetan culture and spirituality.

The current Director, Lama Marco Antonio Karam, was chosen by the Dalai Lama to head the Casa Tibet. Another important mission the Casa Tibet participates in is the sponsoring of Tibetan children located in Dharamshala, India. In Mexico, they have given help to street children, Indigenous children and single mothers. The Casa Tibet does not proselytize, but will not refuse an individual wanting to learn about Tibetan ideology.

== Other denominations ==
Among the Zen institutions registered in Mexico is the Centro Zen de México, affiliated with the Japanese Sōtō school and founded by Taizan Maezumi Roshi.

== See also ==
- Buddhism in Brazil
- Buddhism in Venezuela
- Buddhism in Argentina
- Buddhism in Costa Rica
- Buddhism in Nicaragua
- Buddhism in Canada
- Buddhism in the United States
- Buddhism in Central America
- Religion in Mexico
