= Festa Literária Internacional de Paraty =

Brazilian literary event

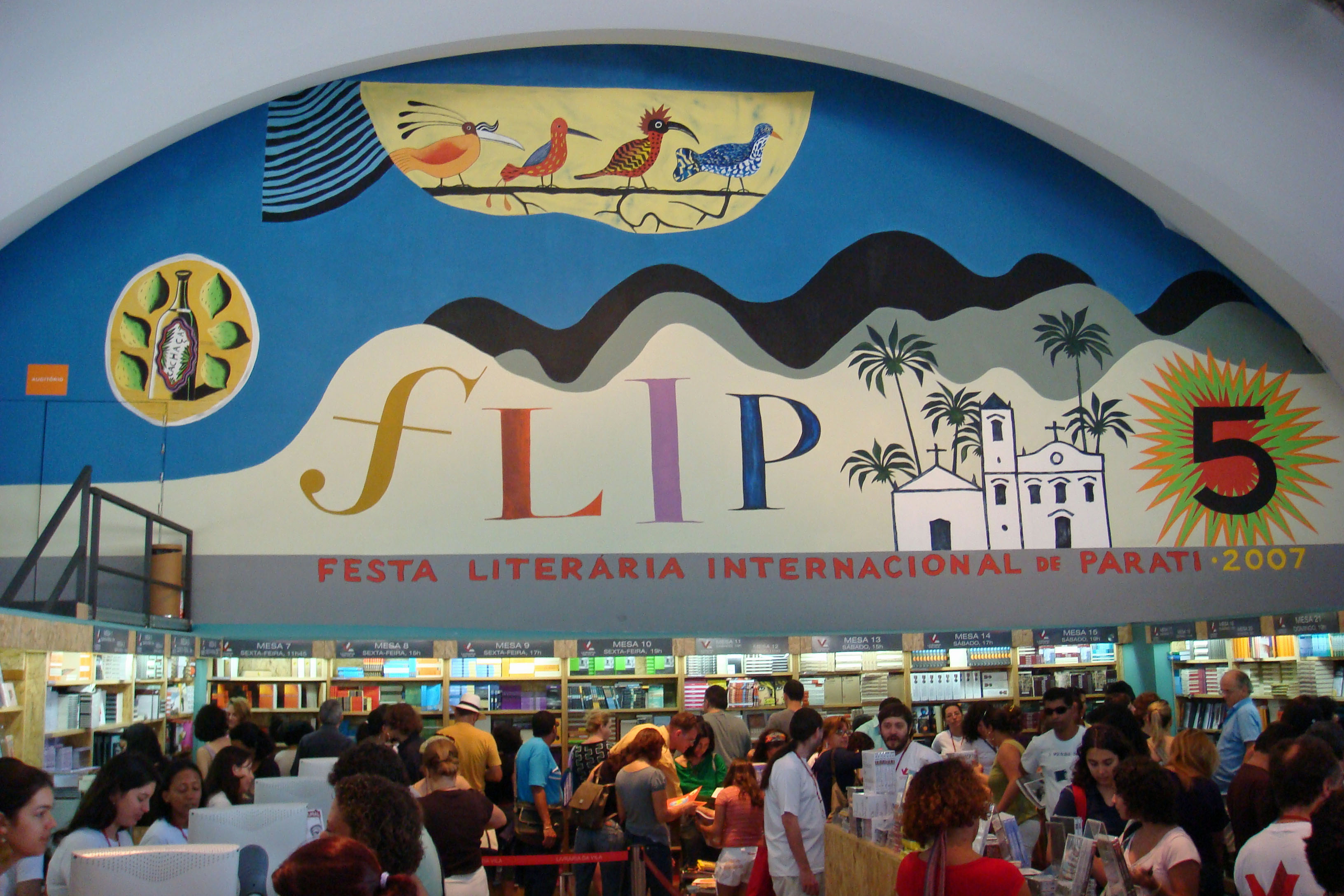
2007 edition of Flip.

The Festa Literária Internacional de Paraty (International Literary Festival of Paraty- FLIP) is a literary festival held yearly since 2003 in the Brazilian city of Paraty, in the state of Rio de Janeiro. The festival usually happens in early July; in World Cup years, FLIP happens in August.

Funding is provided by a graduated system of sponsors and is driven by the nonprofit Associação Casa Azul. In addition to lectures, discussions, literary workshops and events for children (Flipinha) and young people (Flipzona) are also held. The worldwide success since its founding year is mainly due to the involvement of internationally recognized authors from several countries.

The festival was devised by English publisher Liz Calder, co-founder of Bloomsbury Publishing, who lived in Brazil and was the literary agent for several Brazilian authors, using as a model the Hay Festival in the United Kingdom. FLIP is associated with other similar events, such as the International Festival of Authors in Toronto, Canada, and Festivaletteratura in Mantua, Italy, to show intercultural literature.

FLIP originated a pocket edition in the United Kingdom, named Flipside, held at Snape Maltings.

== Authors honored at FLIP ==
Each year the festival celebrates an individual writer.

- 2003 - Vinicius de Moraes
- 2004 - Guimarães Rosa
- 2005 - Clarice Lispector
- 2006 - Jorge Amado
- 2007 - Nelson Rodrigues
- 2008 - Machado de Assis
- 2009 - Manuel Bandeira
- 2010 - Gilberto Freyre
- 2011 - Oswald de Andrade
- 2012 - Carlos Drummond de Andrade
- 2013 - Graciliano Ramos
- 2014 - Millôr Fernandes
- 2015 - Mário de Andrade
- 2016 - Ana Cristina Cesar
- 2017 - Lima Barreto
- 2018 - Hilda Hilst
- 2019 - Euclides da Cunha
- 2020 - Nobody honored (Virtual edition because COVID-19 pandemic).
- 2021 - Nobody honored.
- 2022 - Maria Firmina dos Reis
- 2023 - Pagu
- 2024- João do Rio
- 2025 - Paulo Leminski
- 2026 - Orides Fontela
