= Buddhism in Nicaragua =

Buddhism in Nicaragua has existed since the late 19th century, after immigration from countries with Buddhist populations, mainly China. Although sources are not readily available, Buddhists are believed to constitute 0.1% of the total population in Nicaragua.

== History ==
Buddhism was brought to Nicaragua in the late 19th century when the Chinese started arriving, many of which came from Guǎngdōng (广东) province.

== See also ==
- Buddhism in Central America
- Buddhism in Costa Rica
- Buddhism in Canada
- Buddhism in Mexico
- Buddhism in the United States
- Buddhism in Brazil
- Buddhism in Argentina
- Buddhism in Venezuela
- Chinese Nicaraguan
