= Rob Nairn =

South African Buddhist teacher

Robert G. Nairn (died 30 September 2023) was a South African Buddhist teacher, author and populariser. He was born and grew up in Rhodesia. Nairn was a follower of Tibetan Buddhism, in the Karma Kagyu lineage.

== Academic education and legal career ==
Graduating from the University of Rhodesia with an LL.B (Hons) (London), Nairn was awarded a Commonwealth Scholarship for postgraduate studies in UK and went on to study criminology, psychology and law at King's College London and to receive a postgraduate diploma in criminology from Edinburgh University. He then returned to Rhodesia to become an advocate of its High Court.

Nairn was appointed as a magistrate at 21, which was the youngest ever appointment of this type in the then Rhodesia. He went on to become the private secretary to Minister of Justice, Law and Order of that country as well as a senior lecturer in law and criminology at the then University of Rhodesia.

Moving to South Africa, Nairn became a senior lecturer in law at the University of Cape Town and later a professor of law and criminology and the Director of the Institute of Criminology at the same institution. In 1979 Nairn published a paper "To Read or Not to Read, Aspects of Prisoners' Rights", which exposed the illegality in international law of the South African law that permitted prison officials to deny prisoners reading materials. This article was picked up by the US press, causing embarrassment to the apartheid government. As a result, Nairn was banned from South African prisons, cutting him off from his main research topic.

== Buddhist path ==
Nairn's first contact with Buddhism was with a Theravadin monk in the 1960s, and he trained in this tradition for around ten years. From 1989 to 1993 he took part in part of a four-year isolation retreat at the Kagyu Samyé Ling Monastery and Tibetan Centre in Scotland.

Nairn was the African representative for the late Akong Rinpoche and was responsible for eleven Buddhist centres in South Africa and three other African countries.

As he was instructed by the 14th Dalai Lama to teach meditation and Buddhism in 1964 and also instructed by the 16th Gyalwa Karmapa to teach insight meditation in 1979, Nairn spent much of his time teaching and running retreats in Southern Africa as well as the United Kingdom, Ireland, Iceland, the United States, Italy, the Netherlands and Germany.

== See also ==
- Buddhism in South Africa

== Bibliography ==
- Living, Dreaming, Dying, ISBN 0-9584348-9-1
- Diamond Mind, ISBN 0-9584166-3-X
- Tranquil Mind, ISBN 0-9585057-1-3 (translated into Afrikaans as 'n Stil Gemoed, ISBN 0-9584166-2-1). This book has also been translated into German, Italian, Shona, Spanish, Czech, Dutch and Portuguese.
- What Is Meditation?, ISBN 1-57062-715-0
- Pfungwa Dzakagadzikana, translation of Tranquil Mind in Shona, the first Buddhist book published in an African language - not for sale but free for distribution. More information on the Kairon Press site
- From Mindfulness to Insight (2019) ISBN 978-1-61180-679-3

== DVDs ==
- Psychology of Buddhism, ISBN 0-9585057-4-8
- Psychology of meditation, ISBN 0-9585057-3-X
