= Tanzania Buddhist Temple and Meditation Center =

Buddhist temple in Dar es Salaam, Tanzania

Coordinates: 6.805592°S 39.275993°E

Religion
- Affiliation: Theravada

Location
- Location: Plot No 606, Mindu Street, West Upanga, P.O.Box 6665, Dar es Salaam, Tanzania
- Country: Tanzania
- Interactive map of Tanzania Buddhist Temple and Meditation Center

Architecture
- Completed: 1915

Website
- www.pannasekara.com

Tanzania Buddhist Temple and Meditation Center is a Buddhist temple located in Dar es Salaam.

== History ==
Tanzania Buddhist Temple and Meditation Center is the oldest and first Buddhist temple in Africa. It was Sri Lankan people who, in the 20th century, established the Buddhist temple in Tanzania, after they came to work in Dar es Salaam around 1915. They worked together and formed the “Singhalese Buddhist Association” and then asked for a piece of land from the government of Tanzania. They were bought two acres land in the city center.

A seedling of the Bodhi tree from Sri Lanka was obtained and planted in 1919. Since then, some 85 years ago, it has grown and covers about a quarter acre. Up to 2002, it never bore any seedlings. Now however, some of the seedlings have been planted in other parts of Tanzania like Butiama, Morogoro and the Botanical garden and also in other African countries like Kenya, Malawi, Botswana, Congo, and South Africa.

The Buddhist Association Hall was built in 1927 and this was then registered under the society in 1955. It was not only the Sri Lankan Buddhists who supported the building and maintenance of the Association hall, but also the Sri Lankan Muslims, Christians and Hindus (who worked in Tanganyika at that time) who gave their support. It has two rooms, a sitting room, kitchen, storeroom and bathroom. The Sri Lankan community used this hall for their social meetings, religious services and other activities. The first visiting Buddhist monk was Ven. Palane Narada in 1962, who started the center's nursery school for neighborhood children

== Services ==
The center offers a nursery school for poor local African children. It is a special project created to help the African community. The medium language is English. The age for the kids is from two and half years to six years old.

From 1996 up to now, the center has been sending Tanzanian students who have completed advanced level (metric) education to African Buddhist seminary, which is under the Nan Hua Temple in South Africa, to learn Buddhism for three years. A total of nearly 150 young Tanzanian matriculants have been sent to South Africa to study Chinese Buddhism over the past six years. Those who passed the examination well are given the opportunity to go to Taiwan for a few more years in Buddhist studies.
