= Chagdud Gonpa Sengue Dzong Tibetan Buddhist temple =

Buddhist temple in Uruguay

Coordinates: 34°31′31″S 55°20′10″W

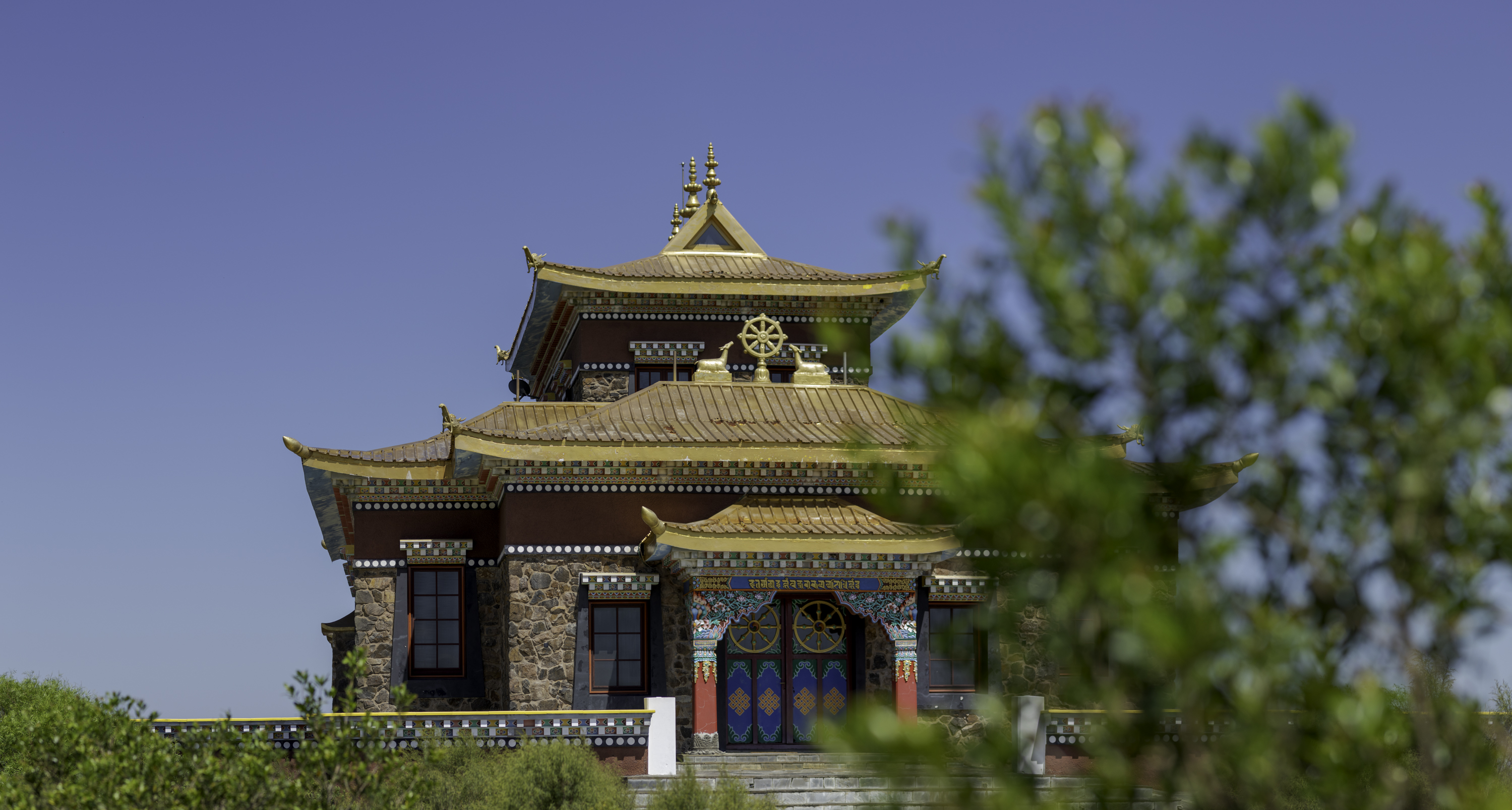
Sengue Dzong Buddhist Temple in 2020.

Chagdud Gonpa Sengue Dzong (Spanish: Templo Sengue Dzong) is a Tibetan Buddhist temple located on the hills of Lavalleja Department, Uruguay. It is unique in Latin America.

== See also ==
- Buddhism in Uruguay
- Chagdud Gonpa
