= The Uganda Buddhist Centre =

Buddhist temple in Entebbe, Uganda

Religion
- Affiliation: Theravada

Location
- Location: P.O. Box 898, Entebbe, Uganda
- Country: Uganda

Architecture
- Founder: Venerable Buddharakkhita
- Completed: 10 April 2005

Website
- Uganda Buddhist Centre

The Uganda Buddhist Centre is a Buddhist temple located Off-Entebbe Road, Bulega, Garuga, Katabi Town Council on Entebbe road, P.O. Box 898, Entebbe, Uganda.

== Organization ==
The leader and resident monk of the temple is veneterable Bhante Bhikkhu Buddharakkhita. The temple is affiliated with the Theravada tradition. Adherents are composed of mostly Ugandans and people of Asian descent (including Thais, Burmese and Sri Lankans).

== History ==
The Uganda Buddhist Centre (UBC) was founded by Venerable Bhante Buddharakkhita, Ph.D., who is a Ugandan by nationality and is the first Buddhist monk in Uganda to introduce Buddhism into the country on April 10, 2005.

The Uganda Buddhist Centre is the first Buddhist Centre in Uganda. It is located on two acres of land at Bulega, Garuga, Entebbe (about 5 km off Kampala-Entebbe main road). The center is open to all people who wish to cultivate peace, harmony, and happiness.

In 2022, the UBD opened the primary school to provide free education to the children in the community; it is also considered the first Buddhist school in Africa.

== Mission ==
Mission

The Uganda Buddhist Centre aims to create an enduring home for the preservation and transmission of the Buddha's teachings by venerable and respectful teachers or masters established in Dhamma, and to continue to develop a landmark of Buddhist culture and teaching in Uganda and Africa as a whole.
