= Nan Hua Temple =

Largest Buddhist temple and seminary in Africa, in Bronkhorstspruit, South Africa

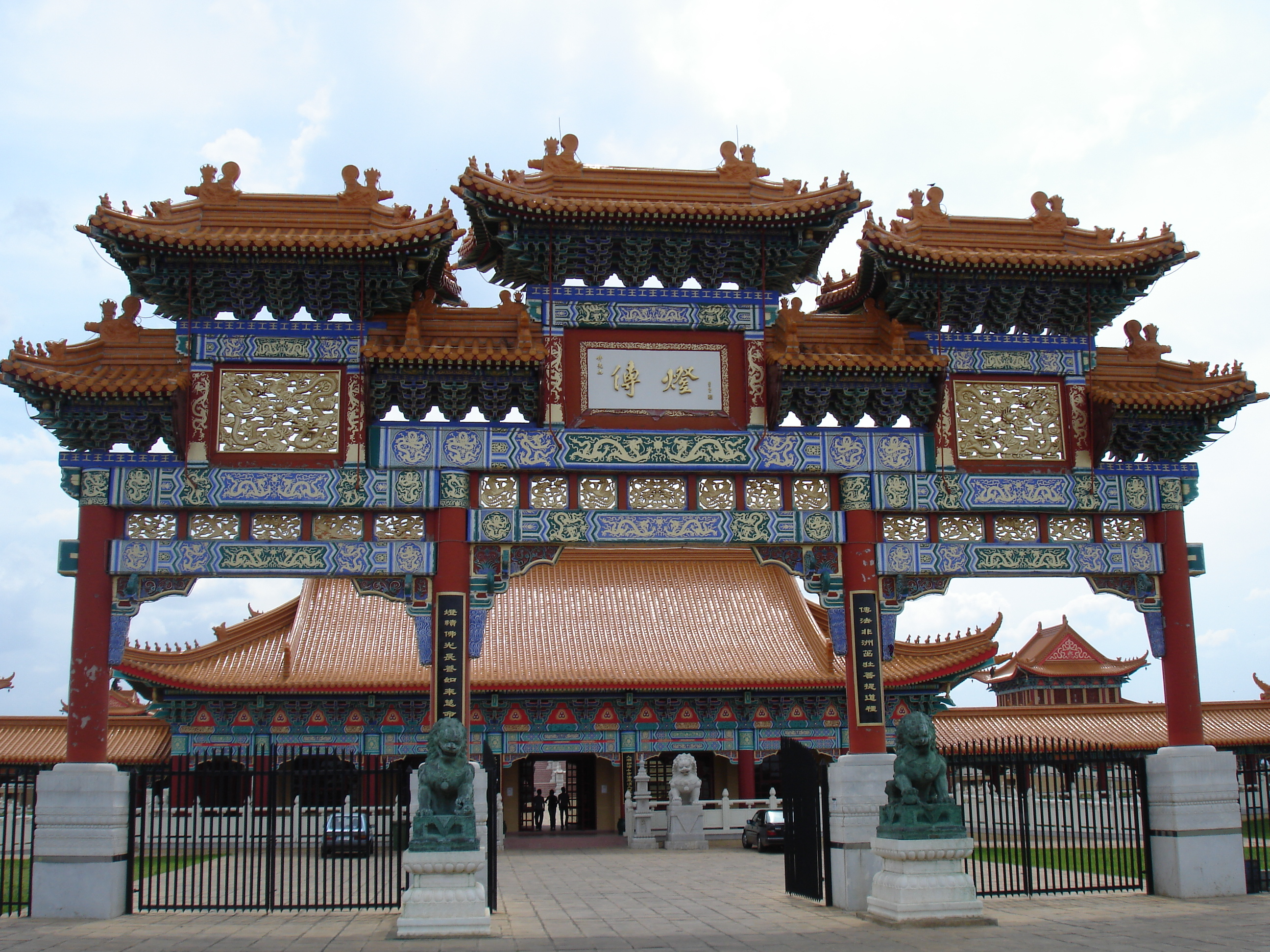
- Nan Hua Temple, Bronkhorstspruit, South Africa

- Location within South Africa

Religion
- Affiliation: Buddhist
- Sect: Fo Guang Shan

Location
- Country: South Africa
- Interactive map of Nan Hua Temple
- Coordinates: 25°49′29″S 28°43′59″E

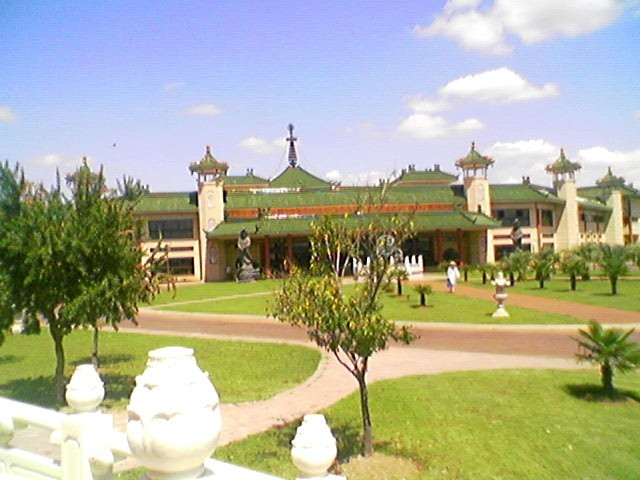
Nan Hua Seminary, Guest House, and administrative Offices

Fo Guang Shan Nan Hua Temple (Chinese: 佛光山南華寺; pinyin: Fóguāngshān Nánhuá Sì) is the largest Buddhist temple and seminary in Africa, and is situated in the Cultura Park suburb of Bronkhorstspruit, South Africa. It is the African headquarters of the Fo Guang Shan (Buddha's Light Mountain) Order, covering over 600 acres (2.4 km^{2}). Fo Guang Shan was established in 1967 by Venerable Master Hsing Yun, and is a Mahayana Chinese Buddhism monastic order. The Temple, like its mother order in Taiwan, follows the Linji Chan school of Buddhism as well as the Pure Land School.

== History ==
The Temple can trace its roots back to 8 March 1992, when the Bronkhorstspruit City Council, under its chief executive and former church minister, Dr Hennie Senekal, who had previously visited Taiwan to promote investment opportunities in his town, donated six hectares of land to the Fo Guang Shan Buddhist Order for a Chinese Buddhist cultural and educational complex.

The Fo Guang Shan Religious Affairs Committee subsequently sent Venerable Hui Li to be the founding abbot of the temple, whose main aim is to promote Buddhism on the African continent. Construction began in October 1992; the eventual cost of the temple complex was sixty million South African rand.

Since then the Temple itself, as well as the Nan Hua Buddhist Temple Guesthouse, African Buddhist Seminary (ABS), Nan Hua Village, Assembly Hall, and a Pureland Ch'an retreat centre have been built. Nan Hua Buddhist Temple has opened branches in other South African cities, in Johannesburg, Bloemfontein, Newcastle, Durban and Cape Town. They are also very active in community, charity, cultural and prison outreach programmes.

The main temple was officially opened in 2005 by the seventh and (then) worldwide head abbot, Most Venerable Hsin Pei.

== Pureland Ch'an retreat centre ==
The Temple also has a specialist Pureland meditation retreat centre that is located about one and a half kilometres away. It is currently (2007) under the direction of Ch'an Master Hui Re. The meditation centre is open to all people – both monastic and laity – and does not discriminate on the basis of religion, nationality, sex, or any other factor. Beginner, intermediate, and advanced Ch'an & Pureland retreats are held, and include an organic, vegetarian diet. The centre includes a large meditation hall, a monastic residence, and residences for the meditation practitioners.

== Abbots and abbesses ==
The abbots and abbesses of Nan Hua since its inception have been:

- 1992–2002: Ven. Hui Li (慧禮法師)
- 2001–2003: Ven. Man Ya (滿亞法師)
- 2003–2006: Ven. Hui Fang (慧昉法師) (1st term)
- 2006–2008: Ven. Yi Chun (依淳法師)
- 2008–present: Ven. Hui Fang (慧昉法師) (2nd term)

== Bomb explosion ==
On 30 October 2002, the Boeremag, a militant Afrikaner right-wing organisation planted a bomb in the basement of the temple. Two staff members were lightly injured when the detonator went off prematurely. At the time a South African Police Service spokesman stated that the blast could have killed and injured dozens of people if the detonator had not failed to set off the explosives. About 150 devotees from South Africa, Australia, Taiwan, Malaysia, and the United States were attending ceremonies in the main temple at the time and about thirty construction workers were close by as well. South African politicians across the political spectrum condemned the blasts.

== See also ==
- IBPS Manila
- Zu Lai Temple
- Chung Tian Temple
- Hsi Lai Temple
- Buddhism in South Africa
- South African Chinese
- Fo Guang Shan Buddha Museum
