= Buddhism in Cuba =

Buddhism is a minority faith in Cuba. Traditionally, most religious people in Cuba practice Christianity or other Indigenous religions. Buddhism was brought by the Chinese immigrants, and has recently seen an increase to approximately 500 practitioners in 2024 and largely due to the Soka Gakkai, a Japanese Buddhist organization.
