= Buddhism in Senegal =

In Senegal, Mahayana Buddhism is followed by a very tiny portion of the Vietnamese community, but it is a syncretic form of Buddhism that includes ancestor worship, by burning the incenses on a small altar and in the end of all prayers are: "Nam mô A Di Đà Phật" (Mean:"Glory to Buddha Amitabha") as traditional of Vietnamese faith that is Bodhisattvas as Địa Tạng Vương Bồ tát and Quan Thế Âm Bồ tát will bless and teach the spirits of dead people how to take a better life in next incarnations or go to Nirvana forever.

The Buddhist population in Senegal constitutes approximately 0.01% of the country's total population. Of this small Buddhist community, 99% are of Vietnamese descent.

Vietnamese people are maybe the only Southeast Asian community in Senegal. With communities of European and Lebanese made-up about 1% of total population in Senegal.

== See also ==
- Buddhism
- Chinese people in Senegal
- Demographics of Senegal
- Religion in Senegal
- Vietnamese community in Senegal
