= Vietnamese people in Senegal =

Vietnamese people in Senegal Le peuple vietnamien au Sénégal
Total population
- 250

Regions with significant populations
- Dakar

Languages
- Vietnamese, French

Religion
- Buddhism

Related ethnic groups
- Overseas Vietnamese

The Vietnamese people in Senegal (French: Le peuple vietnamien au Sénégal) consists of both expatriate technicians and labourers from Vietnam, as well as the mixed-race descendants of early 20th-century migrants. A total of several hundred are estimated to live in Senegal; the national capital Dakar even boasts a few Vietnamese restaurants.

== Migration history ==
Both being former French colonies, Vietnam and Senegal have a long history of cultural links. Beginning in the 1930s, many Senegalese began serving in Vietnam as soldiers for France; some took local wives, with whom they had children. However, in the turbulent 1940s, with World War II and the First Indochina War, many Vietnamese women married to Senegalese followed their husbands back to Senegal. By 2007, Jean Gomis, himself a Vietnamese descendant and an unofficial "community leader", estimated that fewer than five of those wives remained alive, while 300 of their descendants lived scattered throughout Senegal. They retained some knowledge of the Vietnamese language and still cook Vietnamese cuisine; however, Gomis expected that within 10 years, the language would no longer be spoken.

In the 1990s, Vietnamese agricultural technicians began to arrive in Senegal under the sponsorship of the United Nations' Food and Agriculture Organization, through an initiative to promote cooperation between the nations of the global South. By 2001, their numbers had risen from 40 to 100. Most technicians come to Senegal on two year stints, unaccompanied by their spouses, and live in group housing with other Vietnamese. They aim to promote small-scale technologies and techniques suitable to Senegal's level of economic development; for example, Vietnamese beekeepers introduced Senegalese farmers to manually driven centrifugal honey extractors and Vietnamese-style concrete beehives. Others attempted to familiarise Senegalese people to the representative Vietnamese fish sauce nước mắm. Senegalese Tirailleurs returning from the First Indochina War helped popularise various types of nem in the country. Nem rán is still commonly sold as a snack food in Dakar by street vendors, many of whom have no Vietnamese background. Since 2001, nước mắm has only been produced and used by restaurants in Dakar; however, Vietnamese technicians in the seaside town of M'Bour trained a women's group in its preparation, and produced roughly 20 tanks of the sauce. Most of the technicians speak only Vietnamese, though they typically learn some Wolof language agricultural vocabulary during their time in the country.
