= Buddhism in Bulgaria =

Buddhism is a small minority religion in Bulgaria, with about a thousand practitioners. The Vietnamese community in Bulgaria traditionally practices Mahayana Buddhism alongside Ancestor Worship, but the population of this community, which mostly hails from North Vietnam, has declined from tens of thousands before 1990 to around 2,600 as of 2015. Some Buddhist believers in Bulgaria are of Chinese descent. A small number of native Bulgarians are converting to Theravada and Tibetan Buddhism.

There is an officially recognized Bulgarian Buddhist Karma Kagyu organization, which is a part of Diamond Way Buddhism led by Karmapa Trinley Thaye Dorje. They have several centers spread over the country.

There is also a mountain retreat center belonging to the Sky Dharma Community led by Ngakpa Dorje Karma Tsal which follows the Nyingma yogic Dzogchen tradition, with a diverse group of senior students of various Tibetan and Buthanese Dzogchen masters. It does not have any public activity.
