= Buddhism in Morocco =

Buddhism as found in the country of Morocco

Buddhism in Morocco is a small religious minority in the kingdom of Morocco. Estimates for the number of Buddhists in Morocco range from a few dozen, to under 0.01% of the population(or about 3000 people). The Pew Forum estimates that about 0.1% of Morocco's population is Buddhist.

The vast majority of the Buddhists in Morocco are foreigners, especially from Vietnam, Indonesia and Cambodia. There are Buddhist holy shrines in Rabat and Casablanca.

== Zen-Islam syncretism ==
In 1977, the Zen Association of Morocco was founded by the doctor and writer Claude Durix and his disciple Driss Badidi. In 1981, Taisen Deshimaru initiated six Moroccans into the Zen tradition, during a retreat that brought together 200 people near Marrakesh. The Zen dojo of Casablanca was created in 1983 by Claude Durix, himself a disciple of Deshimaru.

This dojo, as well as the association, are now led by Driss Badidi.

Badidi broke with the Association zen internationale, and distanced himself from the Buddhist tradition in favor of a convergence between Zen and the mystical traditions of Islam. This syncretism is made possible through a correspondence of concepts. The sirr (the spiritual "secret") is interpreted in terms of "energy" or "spiritual flows". Allah becomes "the Being". Religiosity is reconfigured as "a path toward self-knowledge". This system of syncretic correspondences then allows Driss Badidi to see in Zen a means of deepening his Arab-Muslim identity.

According to him, around 50 Moroccans initially benefited from his spiritual guidance. During the 1990s, his spiritual techniques gradually took on a more local character. These techniques took root not only within expatriate circles but also among the Moroccan bourgeoisie, which was undergoing significant political and religious transformations. However, the number of disciples at the dojo never exceeded about a dozen at a time. Driss Badidi adapts Zen by removing its Buddhist and Japanese elements, favoring a minimalist approach focused on posture, breathing, frugality, and the universality of the practice. For example, he refuses to place Buddha statues in his dojo and rejects all iconography with Japanese references. Badidi practices Zazen, a form of seated meditation derived from Japanese Zen Buddhism, adapted to the Moroccan context, following the Soto Zen school, which, according to Badidi, is in harmony with Arab-Muslim culture.

Similarly, Rachid Ben Rochd, a former entrepreneur who became a writer after his business failed, practices Zen and yoga, which he combines with the teachings of the tariqa of Sidi Hamza.
