= Buddhism in Croatia =

The first group of the Croatia's smallest Buddhist minority was established in Zagreb on 1970s, a precursor of today's Dharmaloka Buddhist Community. Several groups have formed since, affiliated with different traditions. At present, active Buddhist groups are working to establish foundational practices and communities in major cities. The main three traditions represented presently are Nyingma and Rime (nonsectarian) of Tibetan Buddhism, Shingon and Zen of Japanese East Asian Buddhism, and Chan of Chinese Buddhism.
