= Orides Fontela =

Brazilian poet (1940–1998)

- Born: Orides de Lourdes Teixeira Fontela; April 24, 1940; São João da Boa Vista, São Paulo, Brazil
- Died: November 2, 1998 (aged 58); Campos do Jordão, São Paulo, Brazil
- Education: University of São Paulo
- Occupation: Poet
- Awards: Prêmio Jabuti (1983); Prêmio APCA (1996); Order of Cultural Merit (2007)

Orides de Lourdes Teixeira Fontela (April 24, 1940 — November 2, 1998) was a Brazilian poet, winner of the Prêmio Jabuti and São Paulo Art Critics Association awards.

== Life ==
Fontela was born in São João da Boa Vista, in 1940. She published poems in her hometown newspaper O Município, and in O Estado de S. Paulo's Suplemento Literário. She graduated in philosophy at the University of São Paulo.

Fontela was awarded the Jabuti Prize for Poetry, in 1983, for her book Alba; and the São Paulo Art Critics Association award, for the book Teia, in 1996. In 2007 the Brazilian Ministry of Culture honored her posthumously with the Order of Cultural Merit; her cousin Maria Helena Teixeira de Oliveira received the award.

== Works ==
- Transposição (1969)
- Helianto (1973)
- Alba (1983)
- Rosácea (1986)
- Trevo (1988)
- Teia (1996)
- Poesia Reunida (2006)
- Poesia completa (2015)
