= Buddhism in Brazil =

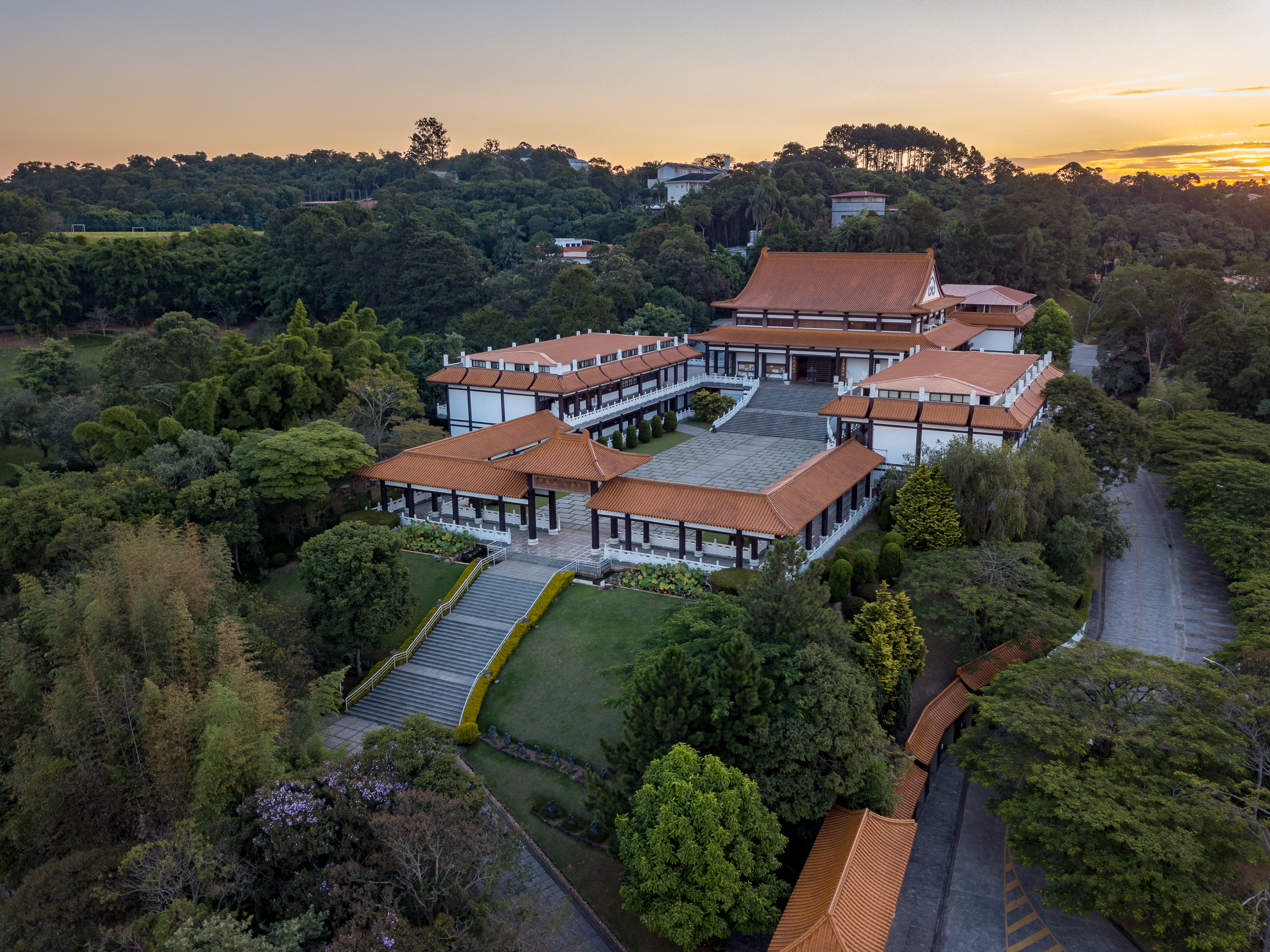
The Zu Lai Temple in São Paulo state is the largest Buddhist temple in Latin America.

With nearly 250,000 Buddhists, Brazil is home to the third-largest Buddhist population in the Americas, after the United States and Canada. Buddhism in Brazil consists of practitioners from various Buddhist traditions and schools. A number of Buddhist organisations and groups are also active in Brazil, with nearly 150 temples spread across the states.

== History ==
=== Initial introduction to Brazil ===
Buddhism was first practiced in Brazil on a very limited scale by small groups of Chinese migrants in the early 19th century. At the start of the 20th century, Buddhism was introduced to Brazil on a larger scale with the mass immigration of Japanese agricultural workers. Typically, early immigrants were not firstborn sons, who in Japan have primary responsibility for religious rituals, and monks were forbidden from migrating by the Japanese Ministry of Foreign Affairs. Thus, religion had a very small role in the lives of these first immigrants with the exception of funerary rites. They mainly belonged to the Jōdo Shinshū sect of Pure Land Buddhism, which focuses on group veneration of the Amida Buddha, that was common in agricultural regions of Japan where most immigrants came from. Religious syncretism was normal and incorporated Buddhism, Shintoism, Roman Catholicism and even elements of Afro-Brazilian religions.

Initially immigrants intended to stay in Brazil for a brief period to earn money and then return to Japan. There was little impetus to create Buddhist institutions, and the lack of temples and monks meant that ceremonies were undertaken informally within the community. The first Buddhist institution in Brazil, the Taissenji temple, was founded by Reverend Tomojiro Ibaragi in Guaiçara in 1936. This was followed by temples in Presidente Prudente and Mogi das Cruzes in the 1940s.

=== Institutionalisation ===
Following Japan's defeat in World War II many immigrants gave up the idea of returning to Japan and stayed in Brazil. With this came an increase in the promulgation of Shintoism and Buddhism among Japanese Brazilians. While Shinto practices had often coexisted with Buddhist ones, the end of State Shintoism and the associated Cult of the Emperor caused the religion to lose its status among Japanese people. Buddhism, however, preserved its status particularly due to its capacity to deal with death and the afterlife for practitioners. From the late 1940s through to the 1960s a number of Buddhist institutions, missions and temples were founded from the Shin, Honmon Butsuryū-shū, Nichiren-shū and Soto Zen schools. The Federation of Buddhist Sects in Brazil (Federação das Seitas Budistas no Brasil) was established as an overarching organisation in 1958. However, many Japanese Brazilians began converting to Catholicism as part their assimilation into wider Brazilian culture. The majority of those born in Japan identified as Buddhist, but a 1958 survey showed that only a minority of the subsequent Brazilian-born generations identified as such.

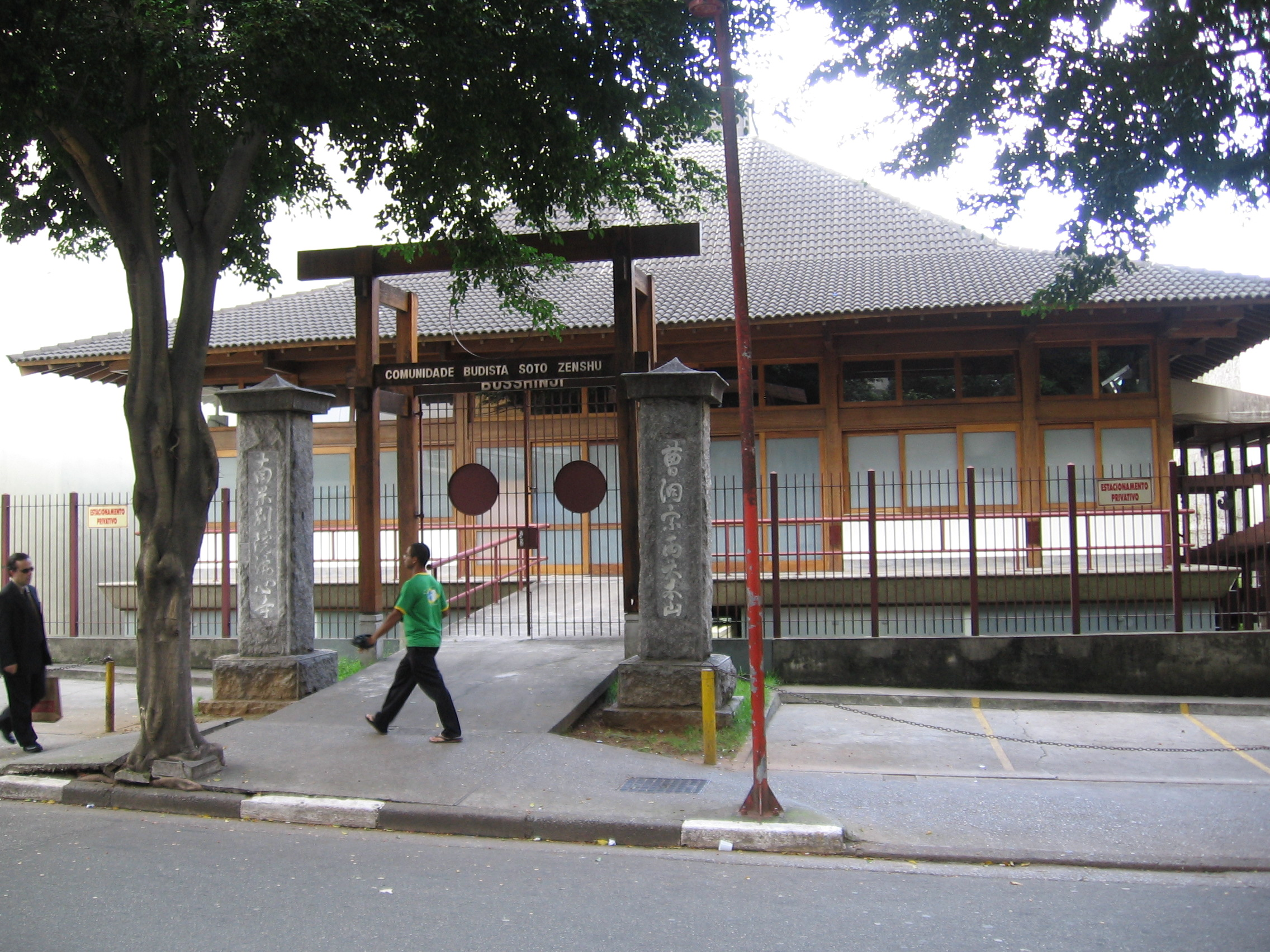
Busshinji, Sōtō Zen Buddhist temple in Liberdade, São Paulo, is the headquarters for the school's mission in South America.

The 1955 founding of the Soto Zen Busshinji temple in São Paulo was particularly important for both its service to the Japanese Brazilian community and outreach to non-Brazilians. Built with fund from the local Japanese community and the Soto Zen school, of which it was the head quarters, the temple assisted in proselytising 3,000 families. The temple was led by Master Rosen Takashina Roshi until 1985. Beginning in the 1960s, Takashina started Zen meditation workshops which in the 1970s opened up to non-Japanese attendees including public figures such as Nise da Silveira and Orides Fontela. The first Zen monastery was established in 1976 in Espírito Santo by Ryotan Tokuda, a monk from the Busshinji Temple, along with new non-Japanese practitioners. In 1984, a second Zen monastery was founded in Minas Gerais and the Zen Society of Brazil (Sociedade Soto Zen do Brasil). A number of other Zen institutions were established by Tokuda in the 1980s and 1990s and by 2000 there were 23 centres and temples and three monasteries for Zen Buddhists.

=== Spread to wider Brazilian society ===
Beginning in the later 1940s, Brazil has received steady waves of Chinese and Korean immigrants. These migrants have brought with them the Buddhist practices from their natives countries. In 1962, the first Chinese Buddhist temple, called Mo Ti, was established in São Paulo. Two decades later, a second Chinese temple opened and was followed by a number of Taiwanese Buddhist temples. The only Korean Buddhist temple in Brazil, Jin Nak, is from the Jogye school and opened in São Paulo in 1988.

Murillo Nunes de Azevedo was one of the first prominent non-Asian Brazilians to study Buddhism. Azevedo was an engineer who had published and taught on Asian philosophy at the Pontifical Catholic University in Rio de Janeiro among other institutions In 1955 he founded the Buddhist Society of Brazil (Sociedade Budista do Brasil) which arranged film screenings and lectures with materials provided by the Sri Lankan and Indian embassies. He translated a copy of D. T. Suzuki's Introduction to Zen Buddhism to Portuguese in 1961. Azevedo later became a Shin Buddhist leader and held a prominent position at the Honpa Hongwanji temple in Brasília.

Similar to other western countries in the 1960s and 1970s, early non-Asian Brazilian Buddhist practitioners were attracted to Buddhism through the counterculture's interest in eastern spirituality. These people mainly practiced to Japanese Zen Buddhism. For non-Japanese Brazilians, their interest in Zen Buddhism lay in meditation and Buddhist teachings rather than the rites and ancestor worship Japanese Brazilians valued. Generally separate institutions catered to Brazilians of Japanese and non-Japanese descent. Where spaces were shared between these two groups, conflicts could arise. In the case of the Busshinji Temple, several temples leaders faced criticism from practitioners of Japanese descent for their more universal approach to Zen and catering to Brazilians of non-Japanese descent. These disputes at Busshinji Temple have led to breakaway organisations forming with a more modern approach and separate practices within the temple for the Japanese and non-Japanese communities. In 1998, Busshinji Temple began a more thorough integration of Zen Buddhism into Brazilian culture including translating sutras into Portuguese and giving lectures in Portuguese though traditional rituals are still performed for the Japanese community. Similarly to Zen Buddhism, the Soka Gakkai school, which started in Brazil with a small Japanese group, has grown by reaching out to non-Asian Brazilians to become the numerically largest branch of Brazilian Buddhism.

Tibetan Buddhism is the most recently introduced form of Buddhism which began to be practiced in the late 1980s. The first Tibetan Buddhist institution in Brazil was opened in 1988 by a master from the Nyingma school. This was closely followed by other centres and temples from the Nyingma, Guelug and Kagyu schools. By 2000, there were 27 Tibetan Buddhist centres in Brazil.

In the 1990s, Buddhism became better known to the wider Brazilian population with stories on Buddhism appearing in many popular magazines. The 1991 Brazilian census estimated showed 340,000 Brazilians practiced Buddhism; however, this does not take into account Brazilians who practice more than one religion nor that Buddhism is often perceived as a philosophy rather than a religion. An Elle magazine articles from 1998 estimated that there were half a million Buddhists in Brazil from a variety of schools.

According to the Brazilian census data, the number of Asian Brazilian Buddhists has fallen from 150,571 in 1950 to 76,896 in 2010. There are several reasons for this decline. Younger Japanese Brazilians have a diminished understanding of Buddhism which is often only associated with grandparents. There are very few new Japanese immigrants to reinvigorate Buddhism in the community. Temples struggle or are unwilling to reach out to young Japanese Brazilians and many do not hold regular services. Japanese Buddhist communities also often prefer to communicate in Japanese which may not be spoken by younger Japanese Brazilians. This is possibly a result of the initial Japanese Buddhist immigrants who saw Brazil as a temporary home and therefore did not utilise Portuguese in their practices.

== Mahayana Buddhism ==
=== Japanese Buddhist denominations ===
Japanese schools and sects of Buddhism, such as Soto Zen, Nichiren Honmon Butsuryu Shu, Jodo-shu, Jodo Shinshu (which district of the Nishi Hongan-ji is known as South America Hongwanji Mission) and Soka Gakkai have a strong presence in Brazil. Despite being the most expressive in Brazil, these schools face a number of challenges which limit their influence and outreach. One of those challenges is the mismatch of goals and expectations between the more traditional, Japanese-born people and the native Brazilians alongside those of Japanese descent.

Although the Japanese contributed to the introduction of Buddhism to Brazil, adherence to Buddhism is not particularly widespread among the descendants of Japanese immigrants, who were largely converted to Roman Catholicism due to assimilation. Those who practice and identify with Buddhism tend to display a wide variety of stances regarding their relationships to the ethnicity and the religious tradition. To various degrees most of them attempt to simultaneously meld with local Brazilian culture according to their personal preferences. Most such schools are attempting to reach out to Brazilians not of Japanese descent, however often facing considerable internal resistance in the process.

Other Japanese traditions present in Brazil include Shingon, Tendai, Nichiren-shū and Nichiren Shōshū schools, albeit in somewhat modest numbers. Recent years also saw a growth of interest in the practice Zen variants from Korea and Vietnam in Brazil.

=== Other Mahayana schools ===
The Chinese Chan tradition of Mahayana Buddhism is centered on the city of Cotia's Zu Lai Temple and its companion Buddhist University in São Paulo State, both of which were opened in 2003 by Fo Guang Shan Order from Taiwan. The temple, near the city of São Paulo, is the largest temple in Latin America, and was built using funds raised from American Buddhist organisations and donors.

The Fo Guang Shan Temple in the city of Olinda, in the northeastern state of Pernambuco, also belongs to the Mahayana tradition.

The Vietnamese Zen school of Thich Nhat Hanh maintains temples and sangha in the cities of São Paulo and Rio de Janeiro.

== Theravada Buddhism ==
The Theravada tradition's presence in Brazil was started by those who created the Brazil Buddhist Society. It was initially presented with a generalist non-sectarian approach to Buddhism, it evolved into a more Theravada-aligned society drawing teachings from the Pāli Canon of the Tripitaka and to other teachings and practices of the Theravada tradition. Since the 1970s it has maintained simple installations built with voluntary work which have hosted visiting monks from Sri Lanka and other Theravada countries. In 1989, the Nalanda Buddhist Centre was established. It maintains affiliated groups in Rio de Janeiro, Belo Horizonte, São Paulo and Curitiba, and has invited many international teachers through the years. Today, there's a monastery affiliated to Ajahn Chah lineage, under guidance of Ajahn Mudito, named Suddhavāri monastery, located in São Lourenço, Minas Gerais.

== Vajrayana Buddhism ==
Tibetan Buddhist temple in Três Coroas, Rio Grande do Sul

All four major schools of Vajrayana Buddhism, Nyingma, Gelug, Sakya and Kagyu schools, maintain active centers in Brazil. Chagdud Tulku Rinpoche relocated the headquarters of his international organization to Três Coroas in Rio Grande do Sul State where he spent the last few years of his life. The 14th Dalai Lama visited Brazil in 2006.

== Contemporary Buddhism ==
Although Brazil remains a largely Christian country, Buddhism has a growing presence in Brazil. There is considerable online activity and dialogue amongst Brazilian Buddhists, with a number of websites and online groups; there are, for example, Facebook groups dedicated for discussion and clarifying doubts about Buddhism and Buddhist teachings.

The activities of Buddhist groups are however a bit restricted due to the linguistic geography of Brazil - since it is a non-Spanish speaking country in Latin America. This limits the cross-boundary activities typical of the Buddhist organisations active in other countries.

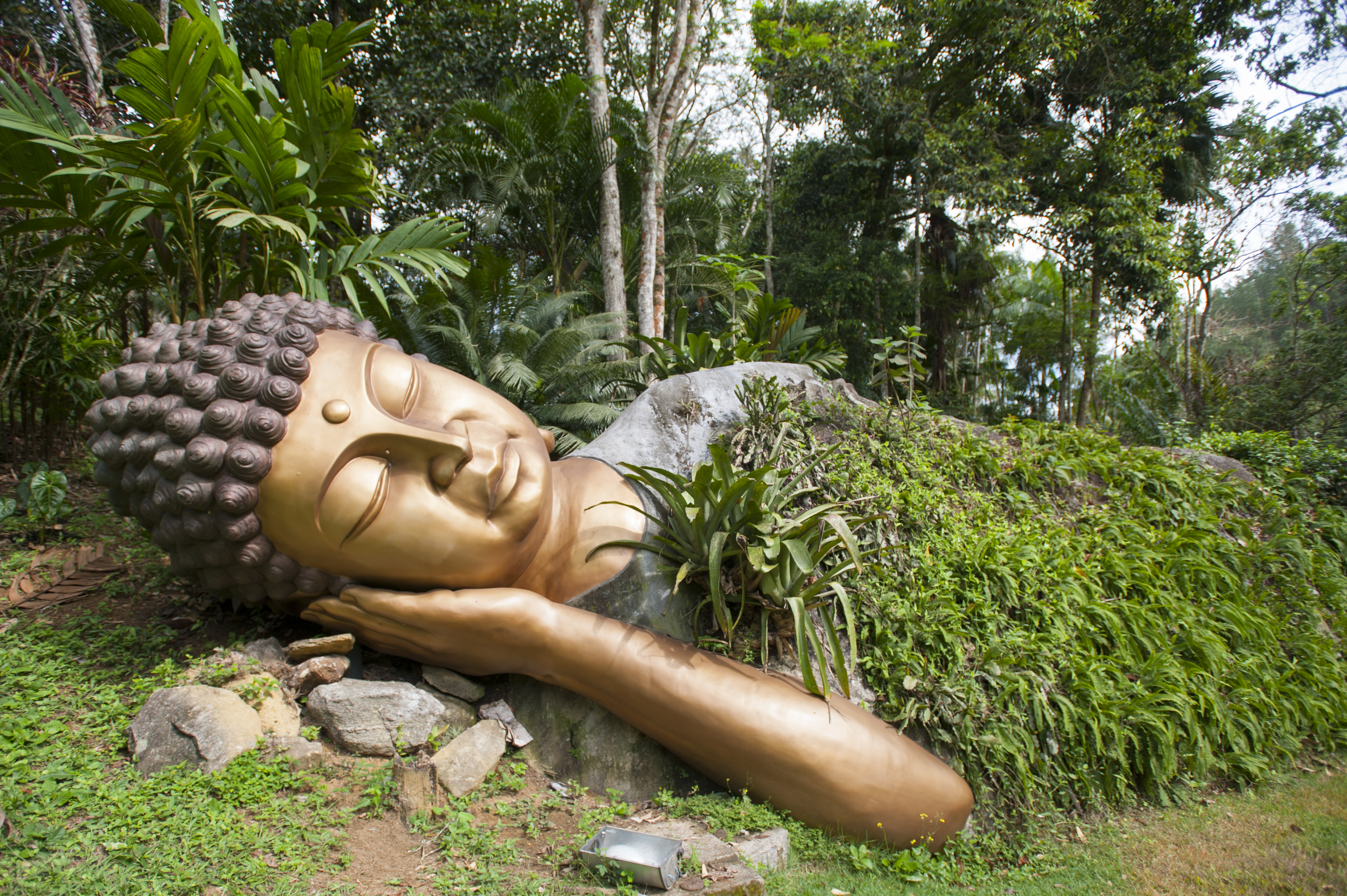
Sleeping Buddha statue that stands at the Buddhist temple in Itarana in the state of Espírito Santo

The State government of Espírito Santo has implemented a special training programme for military police to attend zen courses at the Mosteiro Zen Morro da Vargem.

== Sources ==
- Carvalho, Daniela de (2003). Migrants and Identity in Japan and Brazil. London: RoutledgeCurzon. doi:10.4324/9780203220719. ISBN 9780700717057.
- Gonçalves, R.M.; de Vilar, H.M.R. (2018). "The South American Mission of the Shinshu Otani-ha and Its Contribution to Buddhism in Brazil". International Journal of Latin American Religions. 2: 41–49. doi:10.1007/s41603-018-0043-8.
- Rocha, Cristina Moreira da (2000). "Zen Buddhism in Brazil: Japanese or Brazilian?". Journal of Global Buddhism. 1. Zenodo. doi:10.5281/ZENODO.1310700.
- Rocha, Christina (2006). Zen in Brazil: The Quest for Cosmopolitan Modernity. Honolulu: University of Hawaii Press. doi:10.1515/9780824865665. ISBN 9780824865665.
- Usarski, Frank (2002). "Buddhism in Brazil and Its Impact on the Larger Brazilian Society". In Prebish, Charles S.; Baumann, Martin (eds.). Westward Dharma: Buddhism beyond Asia. Berkeley, California: University of California Press. pp. 177–190. ISBN 0520226259 – via Internet Archive.
- Usarski, Frank (2017). "Japanese 'Immigrant Buddhism' in Brazil: Historical overview and current trends". In Castro, Cristina Maria de; Dawson, Andrew (eds.). Religion, Migration, and Mobility: The Brazilian Experience. Oxon, UK: Routledge. pp. 71–85. doi:10.4324/9781315684475. ISBN 9781138924192.
