= Buddhism in South Africa =

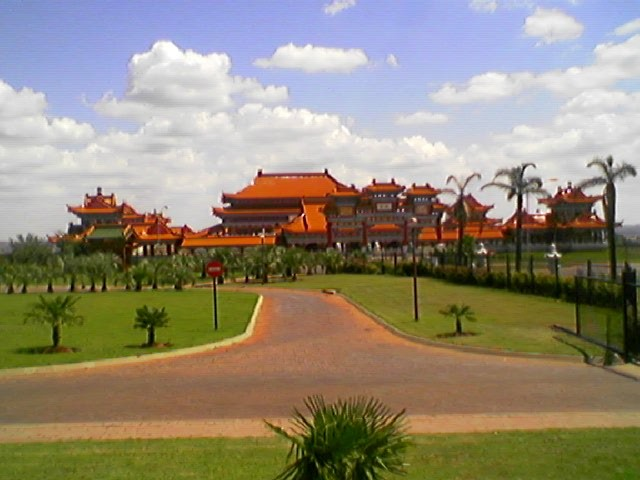
The Nan Hua Temple Complex, near Johannesburg.

Buddhist traditions are represented in South Africa in many forms. Although the inherently introspective nature of Buddhism does not encourage census, adherents to these traditions are usually outspoken and supported by perhaps an even greater, though hidden number of sympathisers. Temples, centres and groups are common in the metropolitan areas and the country is thought to comprise the largest Buddhist community in Africa.

== History ==
Apart from various Buddhist groups brought to the Cape Colony from Southeast Asia during the 1680s, and the many indentured labourers brought to Natal from India during the latter part of the 19th century (some of whom were Buddhist, and some of whom were Hindu who later converted to Buddhism once in South Africa), most Buddhists in South Africa are converts, and not Asian. Various Buddhist groups grew up in the major cities from the 1970s, and there has been a proliferation of distinct Buddhist traditions since the mid-1980s. These include Theravada, Zen, Nichiren and Tibetan schools. Sister Palmo (Freda Bedi) was instrumental in establishing the Karma Kagyu School of Tibetan Buddhism in South Africa when she visited in 1972. At the behest of the 16th Karmapa, Choje Akong Tulku Rinpoche set up Samye Dzong Dharma centres in the major South African cities, which are thriving today under guidance of the 17th Karmapa, Ogyen Drodul Trinley Dorje. The Fo Guang Shan Buddhist order has erected Nan Hua Temple, the largest Buddhist temple and monastery in Africa, in the town of Bronkhorstspruit near Pretoria. Another notable Buddhist centre in the country is the Buddhist Retreat Centre in Ixopo, KwaZulu-Natal. The Nichiren Buddhist lay group Soka Gakkai International has a community centre in Parkwood, Johannesburg. Derivatives of Korean Zen have been established in the Western Cape. The Vipassana Association of South Africa founded by S.N. Goenka has been holding meditation retreats in the Western Cape. More recent additions to the collection of schools include Shambala originally conceived by Chögyam Trungpa, Diamond Way Buddhism, a multicultural Lay Buddhist tradition directed by Ole Nydahl and under the guidance of H.H. 17th Karmapa Trinley Thaye Dorje, and the New Kadampa tradition founded by Geshe Kelsang Gyatso.

A 2003 study estimated that in the late 1990s there were a total of 6,000 Buddhists in South Africa (3,000 of whom had Asian ancestry) out of a total population of 42 million (or 0.01% of the total population). And according to the 2010s estimates, the Buddhist adherents (may included Taoism and Chinese Folk Religion) is increasing to between 0.2% 0.3% of the South African population, or between 100 and 150 thousand people while the number of practising Buddhists maybe low.

== Dalai Lama's visits ==
Buddhist leaders often visit the country to bestow teachings and blessings. The Dalai Lama attended the Parliament of the World's Religions in 1999, and again in 2004, but was denied a visa when he was asked to attend an international peace conference in March 2009. As well when he was invited to South Africa for Archbishop Emeritus Desmond Tutu's 80th birthday party on 7 October 2011.

The 14th World Summit of Nobel Peace Laureates was scheduled to take place in Cape Town, South Africa in 2014, but for the third time, the Dalai Lama had been refused a Visa. The summit was cancelled shortly afterwards when several other Nobel peace laureates cancelled their tickets in protest. The 14th peace summit was eventually relocated to Rome, Italy in December 2014.

The South African foreign ministry denied that it had rejected the Dalai Lama's visa application, saying instead that the Tibetan spiritual leader had cancelled his trip, although it is very likely that relations with China was the main reason for the VISA being denied. This is evident by two facts. Firstly, visas have been denied to the Dalai Lama before, and in almost every case the destination country had strong ties with China, and it has been claimed that China asked those governments not to accommodate the Nobel peace laureate. Also, in February 2014, the Chinese government reacted in anger as US President Barack Obama ignored their request to not meet with the exiled Tibetan leader. Secondly, at the time of the third refusal, the top spokesperson for international relations, Clayson Monyela, could not comment on the matter since he was in China on business.

Following the scandal, the Chinese government praised South Africa for their refusal of the visa, and international relations department spokesperson Clayson Monyela's final comment on the issue was that the Tibetan spiritual leader had cancelled his trip to South Africa and (that) his visa application was a closed matter.

The Dalai Lama later confirmed the media reports when he publicly denounced the South African government during a speech he made in the northern Indian town of Dharamsala. He is quoted as saying, "The Nobel peace summit scheduled to be held in South Africa to honour the legacy of our fellow laureate, the late Nelson Mandela, has been cancelled as the South African government wouldn't allow me to attend it. This is sort of bullying a simple person." At the 14th Summit, fellow laureate, Jody Williams also publicly denounced President Jacob Zuma's government, accusing them of "(selling) their soul and their sovereignty to China".

== Notable South African Buddhists ==
- Rob Nairn, Buddhist teacher, author and populariser
- Breyten Breytenbach, Afrikaans poet, painter and political activist
