= Zu Lai Temple =

Buddhist temple in Brazil

- Templo Zu Lai (如來寺)
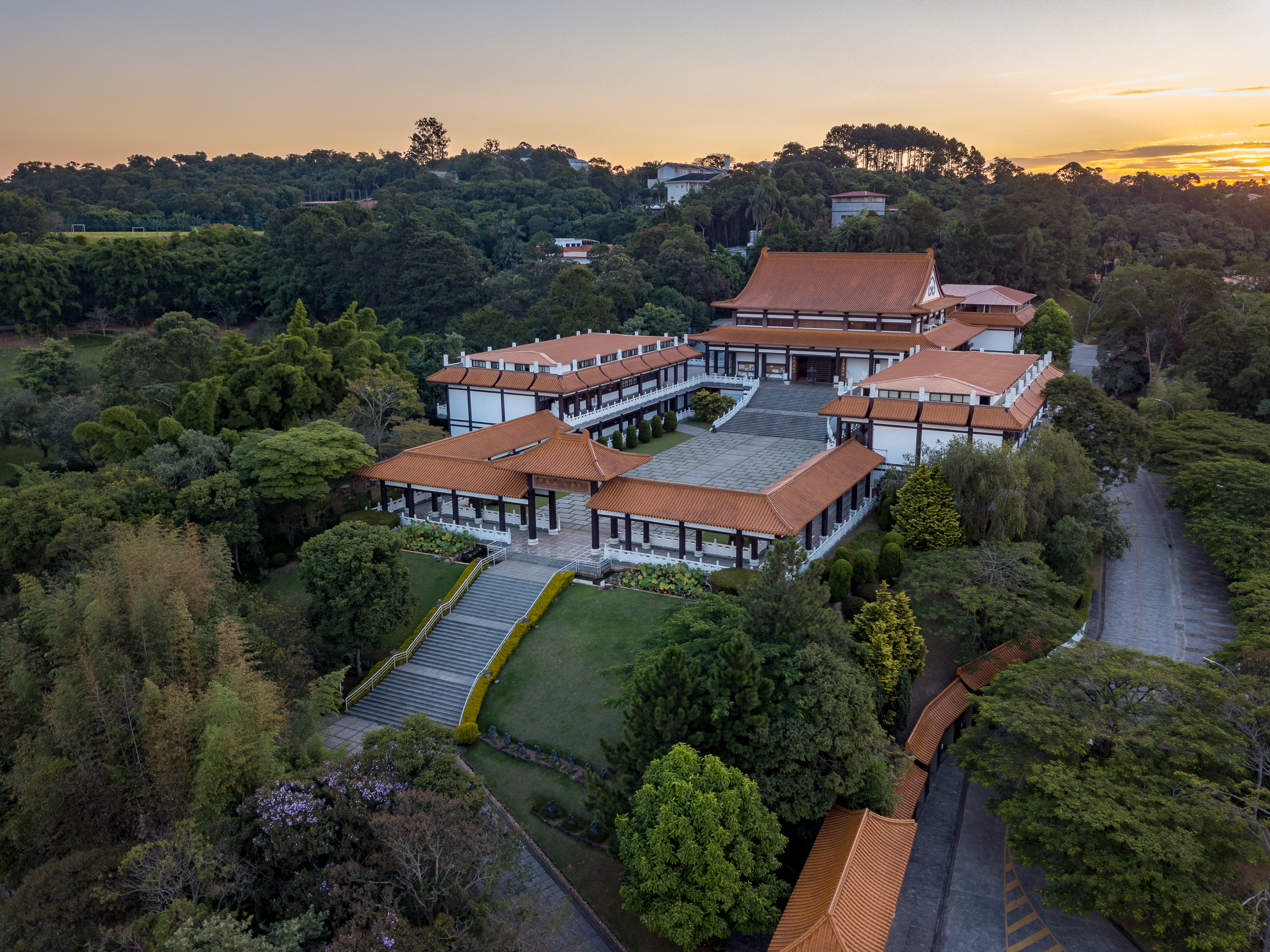
- The Zu Lai Temple

Religion
- Affiliation: Fo Guang Shan

Location
- Location: Cotia, São Paulo
- State: São Paulo
- Country: Brazil
- Interactive map of Zu Lai Temple
- Coordinates: 23°35′13″S 46°52′59″W

Architecture
- Completed: October 5th 2003

Website
- www.templozulai.org.br

The Zu Lai Temple (Chinese: 如來寺, Portuguese: Templo Zu Lai; lit. 'Tathāgata Temple') is a Buddhist temple in Cotia, São Paulo state, Brazil. It is the largest Buddhist temple in South America with 10,000 square meters of constructed area, inside an area of approximately 150,000 square meters. It is a branch temple of the Fo Guang Shan order in Taiwan, practicing the Mahāyāna branch of Buddhism.

== History ==
The cornerstone was laid in 1999. and the temple was inaugurated in October 2003.

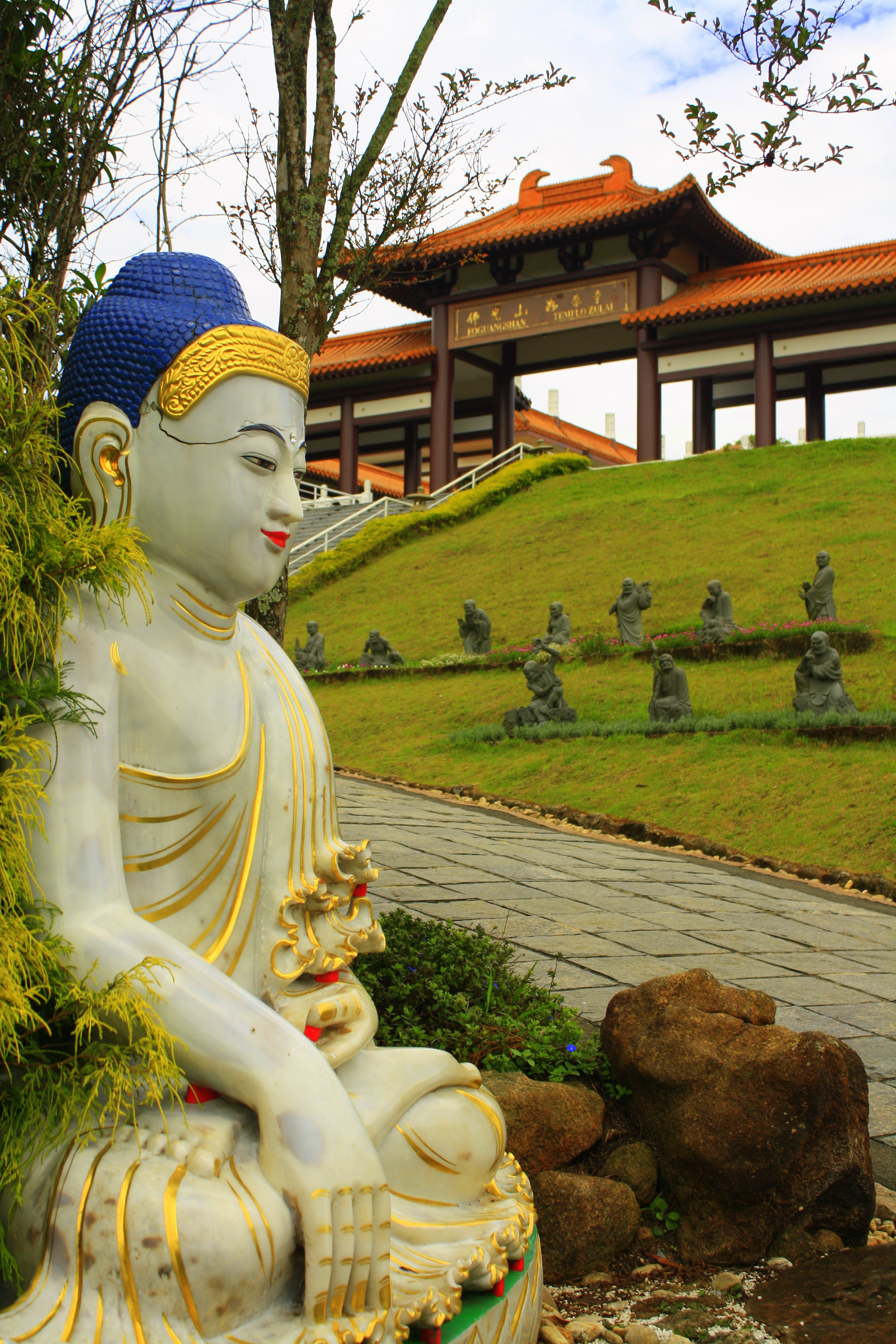
Zu Lai Temple, Buddha statue
