= South America Hongwanji Mission =

Buddhist mission

The South America Hongwanji Mission also known as Comunidade Budista Sul-Amelicana Jodo-Shinshu Honpa Hongwanji is a district of the Nishi Hongan-ji branch of Jōdo Shinshū Buddhism.

== History ==
Jōdo Shinshū was established in South America in tandem with the immigration of Japanese people. The Mission was officially recognized by the Brazilian government in 1955 and is the most recent among overseas temple districts.

The Betsuin (head temple) is currently located in São Paulo. The organization oversees 35 temples, 17 ministers, 17 assistant ministers and approximately 10,000 members in Brazil, Paraguay, Peru and Argentina.

== Locations ==
=== Brazil ===
- Templo Honpa Hongwanji de Brasília
- Templo Honpa Hongwanji de Tomé-Açu
- Templo Honpa Hongwanji de Cuiabá
- Templo Honpa Hongwanji Belém
- Templo Honpa Hongwanji - Anápolis
- Templo Honpa Hongwanji de Goiânia
- Templo Honpa Hongwanji do Rio de Janeiro
- Templo Monshinji
- Templo Honpa Hongwanji de Paraíba
- Templo Honpa Hongwanji de São José dos Campos
- Templo Honpa Hongwanji de Campinas
- Templo Honpa Hongwanji Itu Bukyo-Kai
- Templo Honpa Hongwanji de Mogi das Cruzes
- Templo Honpa Hongwanji de Suzano
- Templo Honpa Hongwanji Itaquera Bukyo-Kai
- Templo Honpa Hongwanji de Santo André
- Templo Honpa Hongwanji de Joshinji
- Templo Honpa Hongwanji de São Paulo
- Templo Honpa Hongwanji de Osasco
- Templo Honpa Hongwanji Piedade Bukyo-Kai
- Templo Honpa Hongwanji Pilar do Sul Bukyo-Kai
- Templo Honpa Hongwanji de Registro
- Pereira Barreto Honpa Bukyo-Kai
- Templo Honpa Hongwanji de Andradina
- Mirandópolis Bukyo-Kai
- Guararapes Bukyo-Kai
- Templo Honpa Hongwanji de Noroeste
- Templo Honpa Hongwanji de Lins
- Templo de Komyoji
- Tupi Paulista Bukyo-Kay
- Dracena Bukyo-Kay
- Templo Honpa Hongwanji de Junqueirópolis
- Templo Honpa Hongwanji de Pacaembu
- Florida Paulista Bukyo-Kay
- Templo Honpa Hongwanji de Adamantina
- Templo Honpa Hongwanji de Lucélia
- Templo Honpa Hongwanji de Osvaldo Cruz
- Templo Honpa Hongwanji de Tupã
- Templo Honpa Hongwanji Pompéia Shinshu Bukyo-Kai
- Templo Honpa Hongwanji de Marília
- Templo Honpa Hongwanji de Anrakuji
- Templo Honpa Hongwanji de Presidente Prudente
- Templo Honpa Hongwanji de Ourinhos
- Templo Honpa Hongwanji de Paranavaí
- Templo Honpa Hongwanji de Maringá
- Mandaguari Bukyo-Kay
- Rolândia Bukyo-Kay
- Templo Honpa Hongwanji de Londrina
- Templo Honpa Hongwanji de Registro
- Templo Hongwanji de Curitiba
- Templo Honpa Hongwanji de Amambay

=== Peru ===
- Templo Honpa Hongwanji de Peru

=== Argentina ===
- Templo Honpa-Hongwanji de Buenos Aires
