= Buddhism in Uruguay =

Buddhism in Uruguay is practiced by less than 0.1% of the population (some 1000 people). There are several schools: Tibetan Buddhism (Diamond Way and Chagdud Gonpa), Theravada, Sōtō Zen, Nichiren Buddhism (Soka Gakkai).

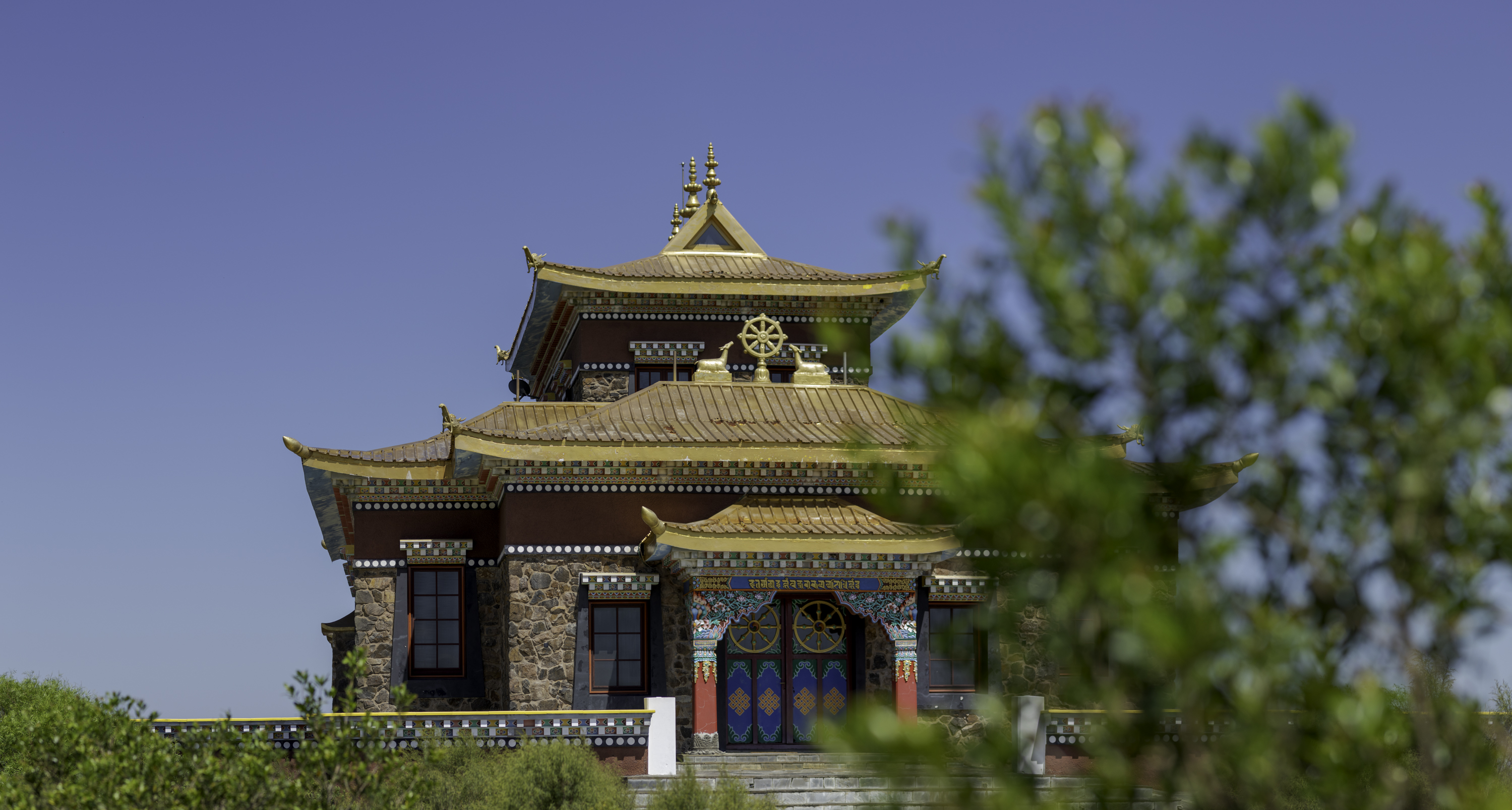
Sengue Dzong Buddhist Temple in 2020.

A number of institutions were established in the 20th century: Asociación Civil Religiosa Cultura Dhamma, Centro Budista Camino del Diamante, Chagdad Gonpa Hispanoamérica.

One of the most revealing sites is Chagdud Gonpa Sengue Dzong Tibetan Buddhist temple located on the hills of Lavalleja Department.
