= Buddhism in Central America =

Buddhism is practiced throughout Central America. Buddhism's presence in the region was primarily driven by the presence of Chinese immigrant workers during the early 19th century. Presently, Buddhism in the region is primarily of the Mahayana and Vajrayana schools, with many countries in the region having several Buddhist temples, schools, and meditation centers.

== Buddhist percentage by country ==
Buddhism by country in the Central America
National flag	Country	Population(2007E)	% of Buddhists	Buddhist total
	Belize	294,385	0.35%	1,030
	Costa Rica	4,133,884	2.34%	96,733
	El Salvador	7,076,598	0.1%	7,076
	Guatemala	12,728,111	0.1%	12,728
	Honduras	7,483,763	0.1%	7,484
	Nicaragua	5,675,356	0.1%	5,675
	Panama	3,242,173	0.1%	100
Total		40,634,270	0.489%	198,812
