= Buddhism in Costa Rica =

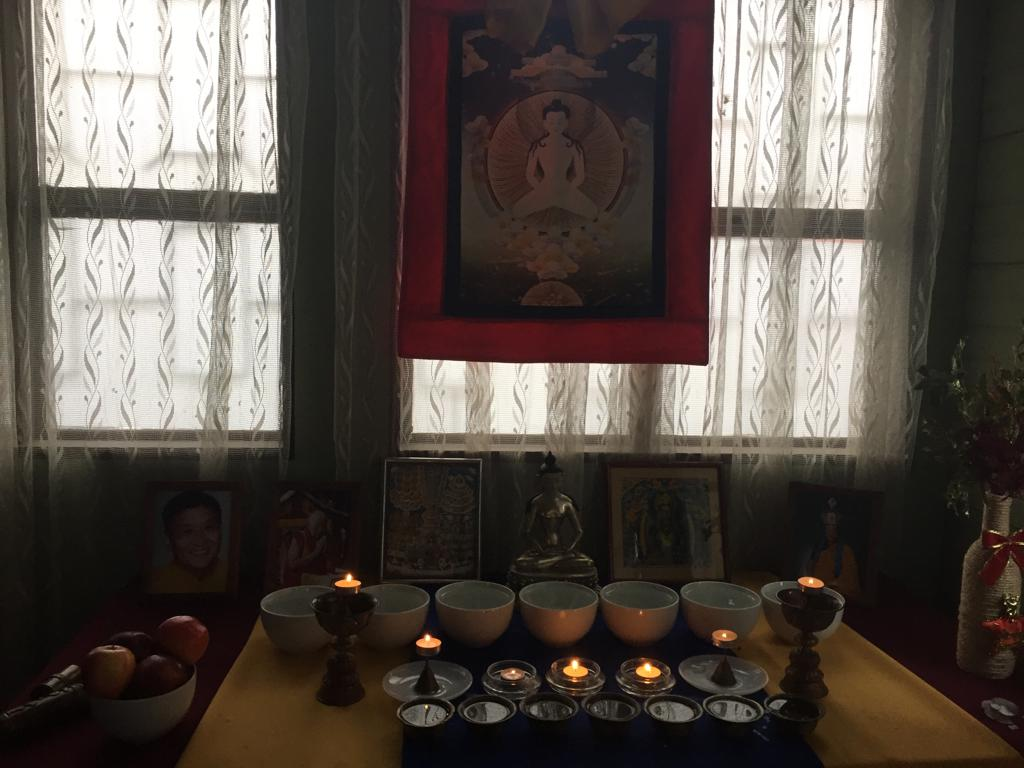
Tibetan Buddhist altar in Costa Rica

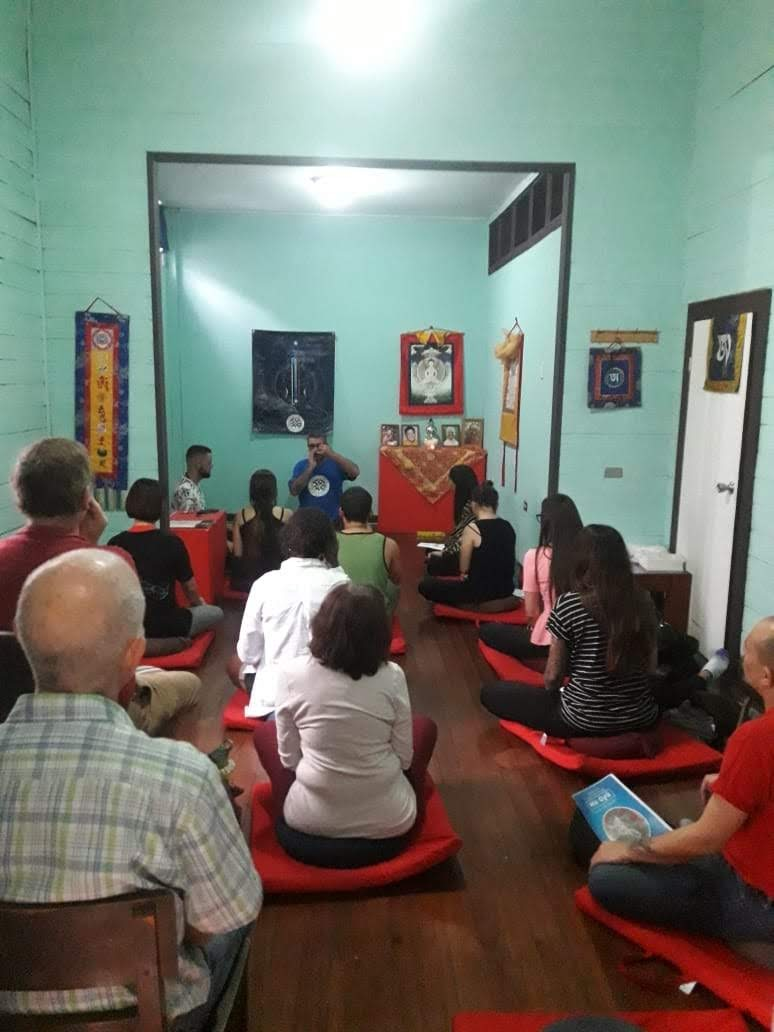
Buddhist practitioners in Costa Rica

Costa Rica has more Buddhists than the other countries in Central America with almost 100,000 (2.34% of total population), followed closely by Panama, with almost 70,000 (2.1% of total population).

Buddhism was introduced in the country for the first time by Chinese immigrants during the early 19th and 20th century, but an important part of these migrants later became --at least nominally-- Roman Catholics due to the then very Conservative Catholic-lead society. But there is evidence that some of them practiced their Buddhist beliefs discreetly, for example, the testimony of writer Jorge Cardona of Buddhist altars among Chinese merchants in the early 20th century Puntarenas. Another source of Buddhism in the country was the Theosophical Society, popular among important members of the economic and intellectual elite. Among the poets and theosophists that wrote Buddhist-influenced poetry are Roberto Brenes Mesén and José Basileo Acuña Zeledón. However one of the first Buddhist temples made in the country was the Casa Zen (Zen House) of Costa Rica created in 1974 with support of the Japanese government, followed by the first Dharma Center of Tibetan Buddhism of the Gelug tradition founded in 1989 after the Dalai Lama's first visit to the country.

In recent years there has been a tendency for growing dissatisfaction with Catholicism, the dominant religion. Some convert to other branches of Christianity, most notably Protestantism (with a growing number of Protestant churches throughout Costa Rica). But others stay as agnostics, atheists or "free thinkers". It is these latter groups, especially if already interested or practicing some form of meditation, that can become influenced or inspired by "exotic religions" (in Costa Rica) such as Buddhism and therefore convert to it, or adopt it as a philosophy.

== Tibetan Buddhism ==
The four traditional schools of Tibetan Buddhism are present in Costa Rica.

The best known and first group is the "Asociación Cultural Tibetano-Costarricense" (Tibetan-Costarrican Cultural Association), which was established in 1989 CE after the first visit of the XIV Dalai Lama, Tenzin Gyatso in Latin America. Years later, in 2004 CE, the XIV Dalai Lama revisited Costa Rica. He gave some discourses, including one in the University of Costa Rica and took part in ecumenical activities that included Costa Rica's archbishop. The Dalai Lama's third visit planned for 2008 was cancelled after the Costa Rican government under Oscar Arias Sánchez renewed relations with the People's Republic of China over Taiwan, resulting in soured relationships with the Buddhist community and criticism from the opposition. Opposition leader Ottón Solís publicly supported the Dalai Lama and promise to name the National Stadium in his honor in case he won the presidency.

The ACTC runs the Thousand Eyes Compassive Buddha Dharma Center located in Barrio Amón, San José City. This center is of the Gelug tradition.

There is also a Lingmincha Center of the Nyingma-Bon tradition.

== Buddhist New religious movements present in Costa Rica ==
There is a Soka Gakkai center operating in Costa Rica.

There are two Diamond Way centers in Costa Rica, part of the group founded by Ole Nydahl. One was founded San José in 2010. The other was founded in 2022 and is located in San Mateo, Orotina.

== Zen Buddhism ==
The Casa Zen of Costa Rica center is located in Santo Domingo, Heredia.

== Others ==
There are also temples of Theravada Buddhism, Shaolin and a Chinese Buddhist Pagoda.

== Gallery ==
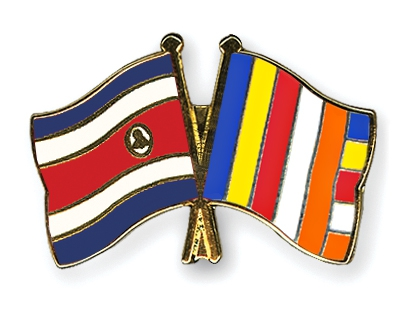
Buddhist-Costa Rican flags

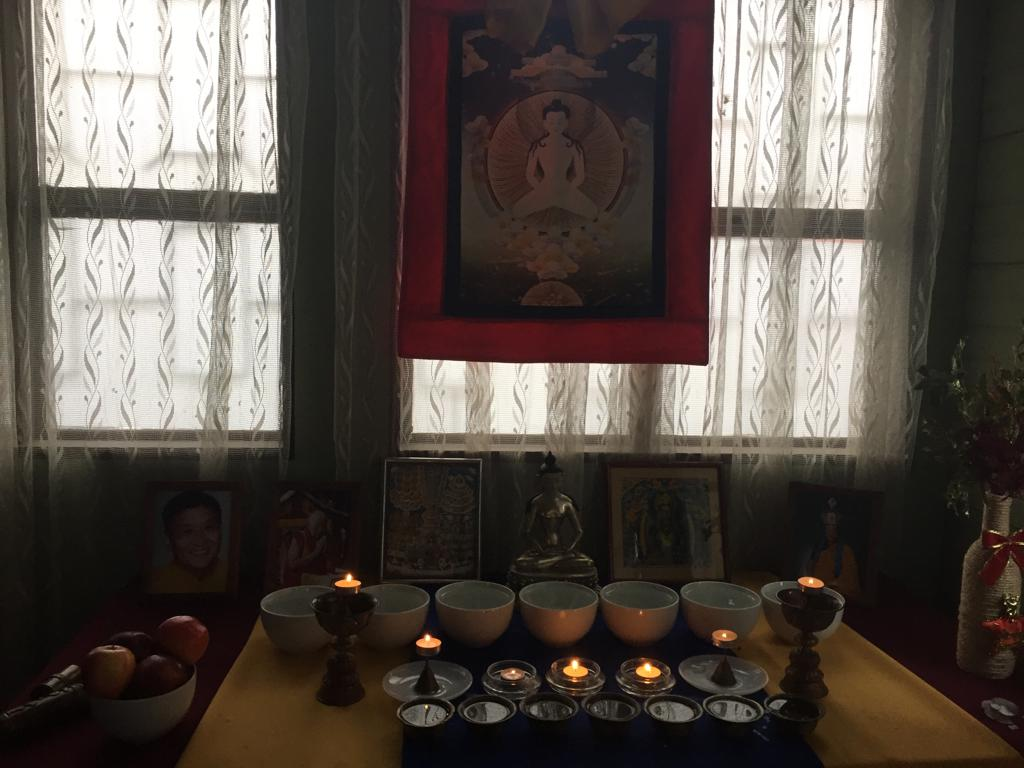
Tibetan Buddhist altar in Costa Rica

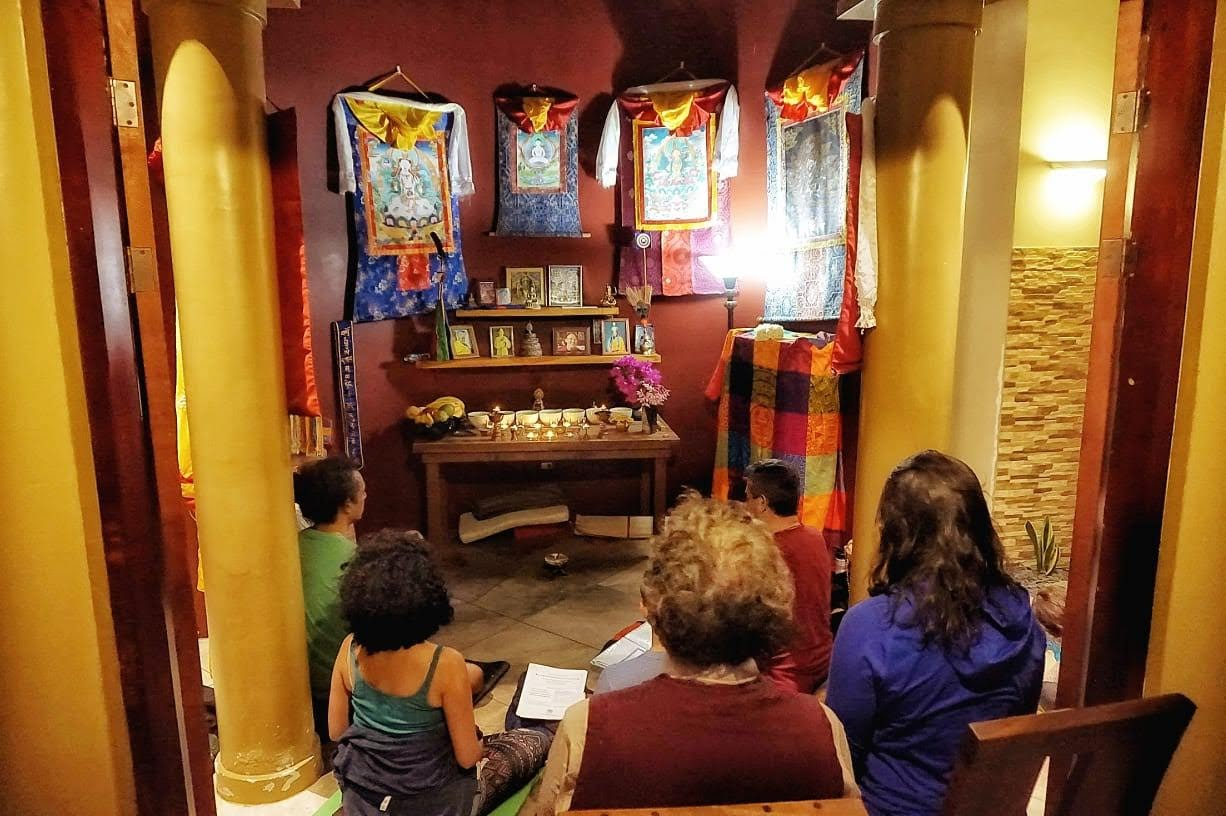
Bon family in Costa Rica

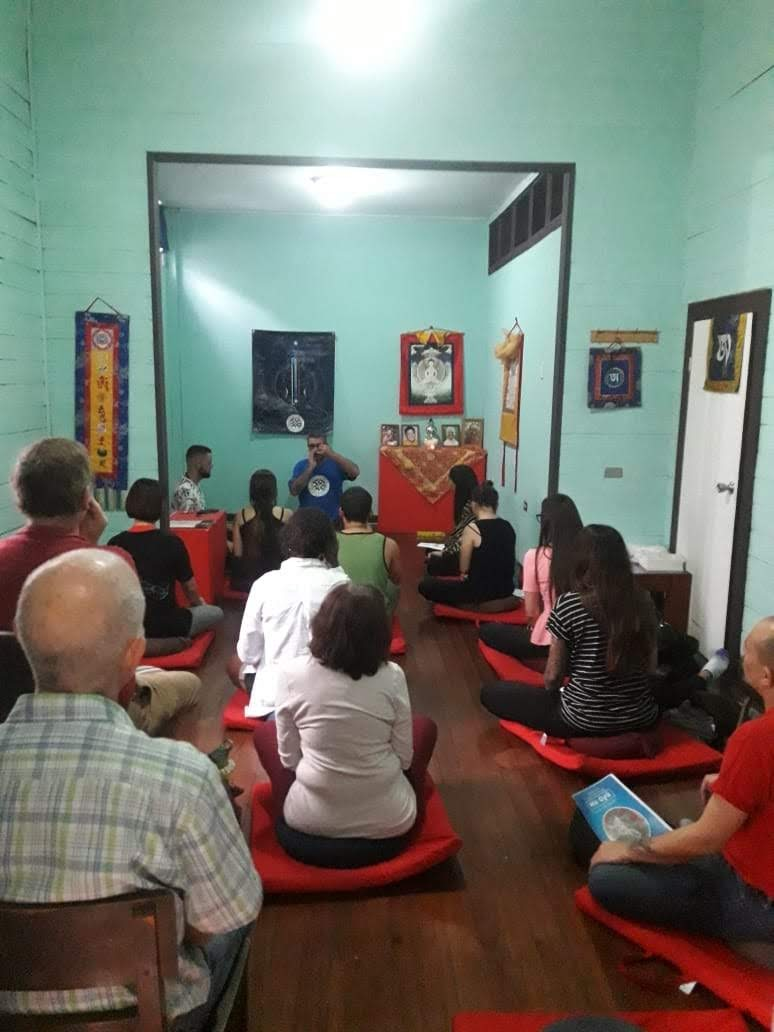
Buddhist practitioners in Costa Rica

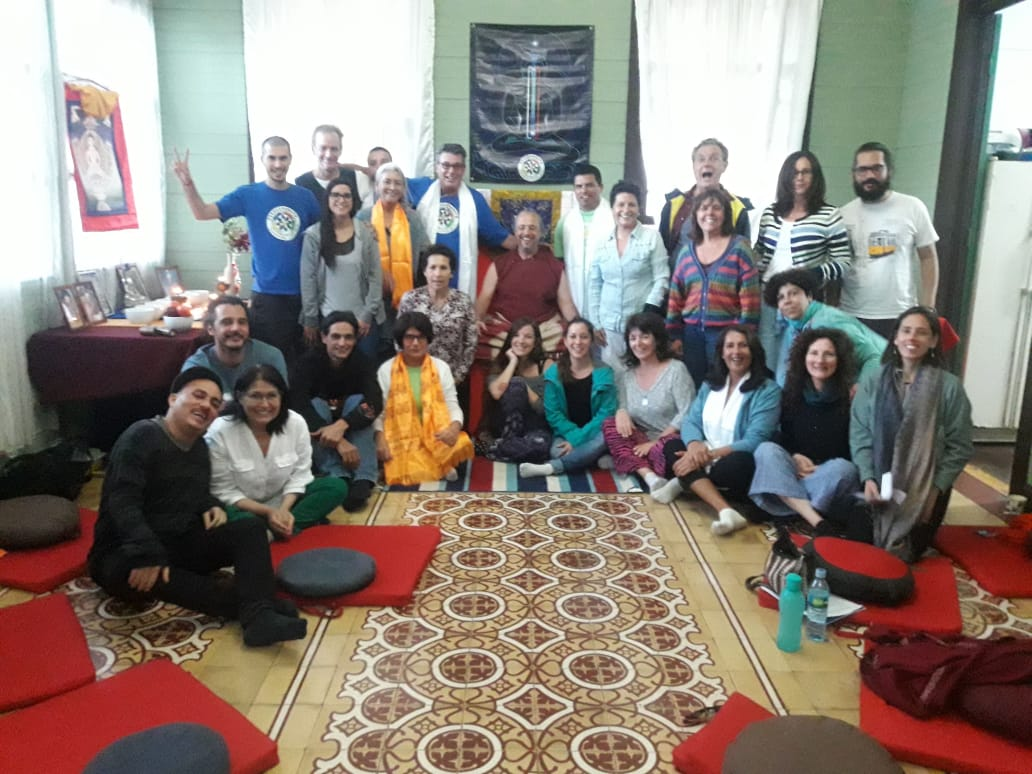
Spiritual retreat in Costa Rica

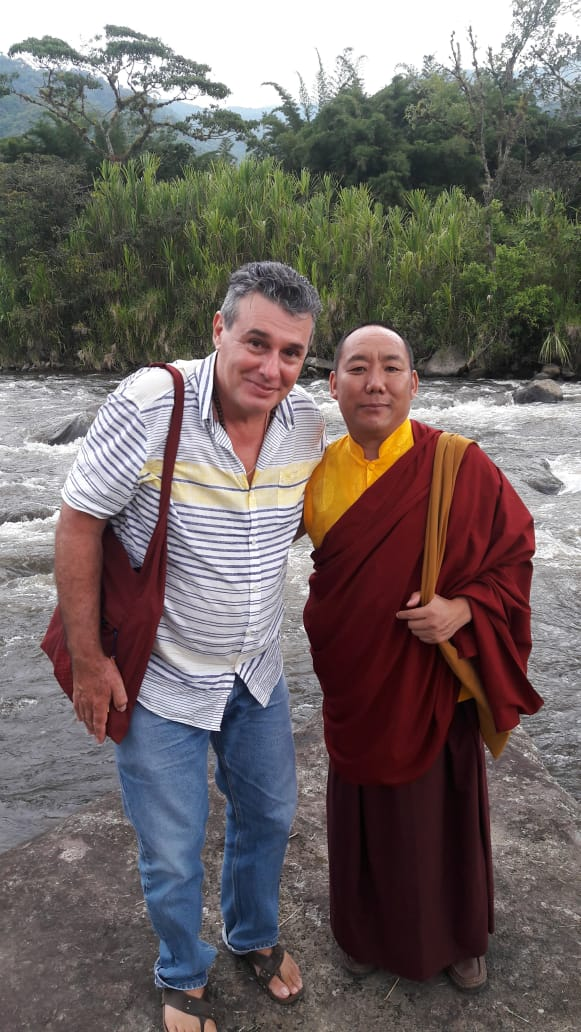
Tibetan lama alongside local practitioner in the Orosi River
