= Buddhism in Spain =

- Flag of Spain

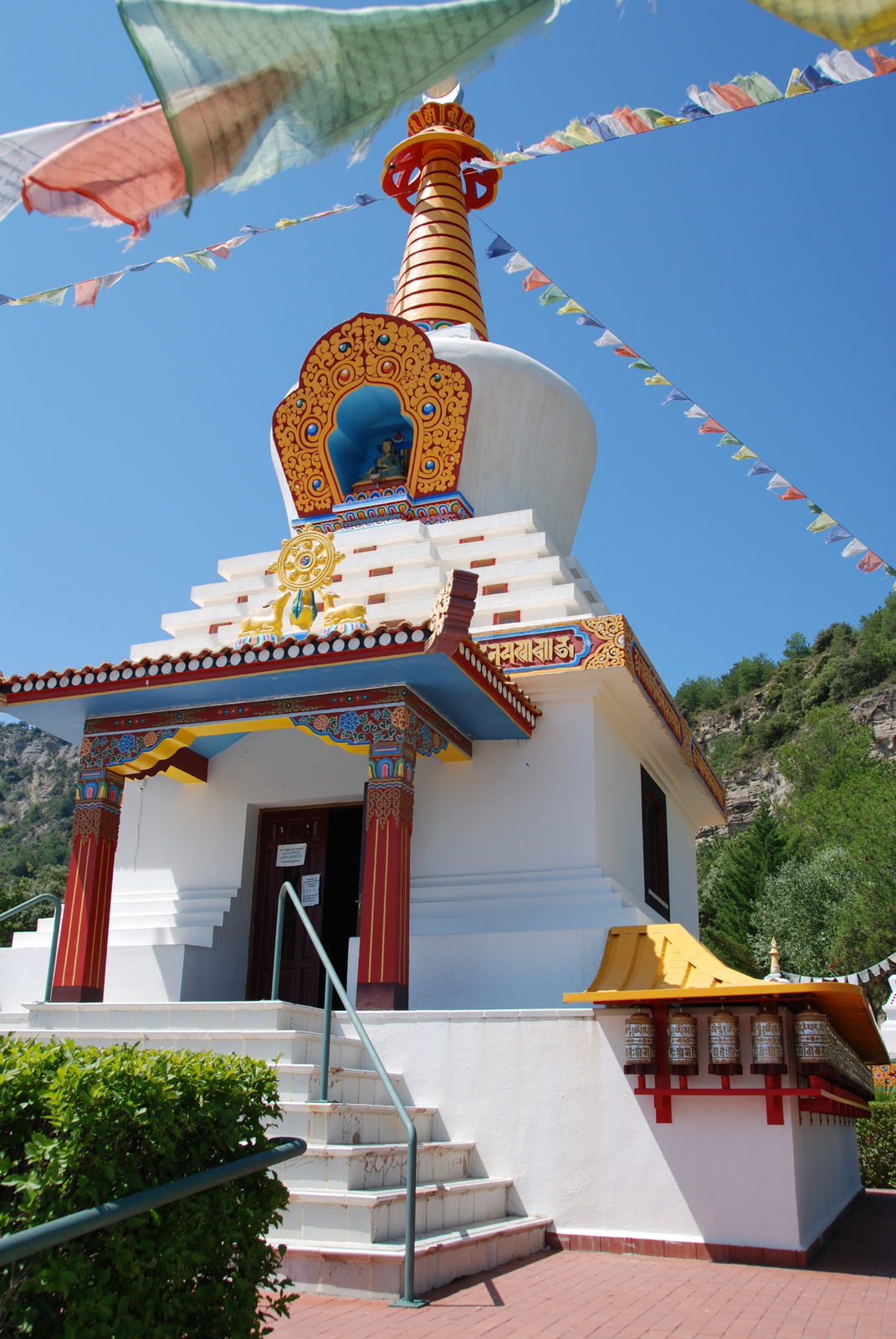
- Dag Shang Kagyü in Huesca

Total population
- c. 300,000

Regions with significant populations
- Throughout Spain

Religions
- Buddhism (Tibetan, Zen, Theravada)

Languages
- Spanish and other languages

Buddhism (Spanish: Budismo) is the fourth-largest religion in Spain. The presence of Buddhism in Spain began in the late 1970s, brought from other parts of Europe, especially France. Despite its short history in the country, Buddhism was recognized as a deep-rooted religious confession in 2007, under official consideration. This recognition implies its equivalence in recognition with most other established religions for legal, political, and administrative purposes. Much of the Buddhist tradition in Spain has grown out of the Buddhist Union of Spain, the Federation of Buddhist Organizations of Spain (Spanish: Unión Budista de España-Federación de Entidades Budistas de España; UBE-FEBE), which was established in 1990. The first schools in Spain were Zen (of Mahayana Buddhism) and Kagyu (lineage of Tibetan Buddhism), and they have the largest community in the country today. There are dozens of Buddhist practising centers in the country. According to an estimation from 2018, there are around 90,000 followers of Buddhism in Spain, with a total number of around 300,000 adherents if sympathizers are included.

== History ==
In Spain, the first study center for Buddhism was opened in Barcelona in 1977 and belongs to the Karma Kagyu school, propagated by Akong Rinpoche. In 1977, lamas Thubten Yeshe and Zopa Rinpoche came to Ibiza, where they promoted the creation of a network of centers in the Gelug school of Tibetan Buddhism. In the spring of that year, a Buddhist dojo was founded in Seville by Taisen Deshimaru. Later, more monasteries, temples, and retreat centers were built in selected locations, usually far from the big cities, such as Dag Shang Kagyü. This temple, founded by Kalu Rinpoche, is one of the most important in Spain and is the center on which more than ten centers founded in Huesca in 1984.

Sakya Tashi Ling is a monastery located near Barcelona, associated with the Sakya school and founded in 1996. The Samye Dechi Ling monastery in Catalonia operates as a center for long-term retreats.

In 2003 the Enlightenment Stupa was built as the final project of Teacher Lopon Tsechu Rinpoche. At 33 m (108 feet) tall, it is the largest stupa in the West.

International Centre for Buddhist Studies near Pedreguer in the Alicante region of Spain, is a Sakya Buddhist monastery. It is managed by the Sakya Foundation and was formerly led by Sakya Trizin. The resident teacher at the monastery is Ngawang Lekshe Rinchen Gyaltsen.

== Demography ==
It was estimated in 2018 that in Spain there were about 100,000 Buddhists registered in study centers, and 300,000 total adherents in the country including those who sympathize with Buddhism.

== Bibliography ==
- Baumann, Martin (2001). Global Buddhism: Developmental Periods, Regional Histories, and a New Analytical Perspective, Journal of Global Buddhism 2, 1-43
- Johnson, Todd M.; Grim, Brian J. (2013). The World's Religions in Figures: An Introduction to International Religious Demography (PDF). Hoboken, NJ: Wiley-Blackwell. pp. 34–36. Archived from the original (PDF) on 20 October 2013.
- Offermanns, J. (2005). Debates on atheism, quietism, and sodomy: the initial reception of Buddhism in Europe. Journal of Global Buddhism 6, 16-35
- Koné, A. (2001). Zen in Europe: a survey of the territory. Journal of Global Buddhism 2, 139-161

== See also ==
- Buddhism in Europe
- Religion in Spain
- Buddhism and science
- Buddhist art
- Buddhism in the West
