= Buddhism in Europe =

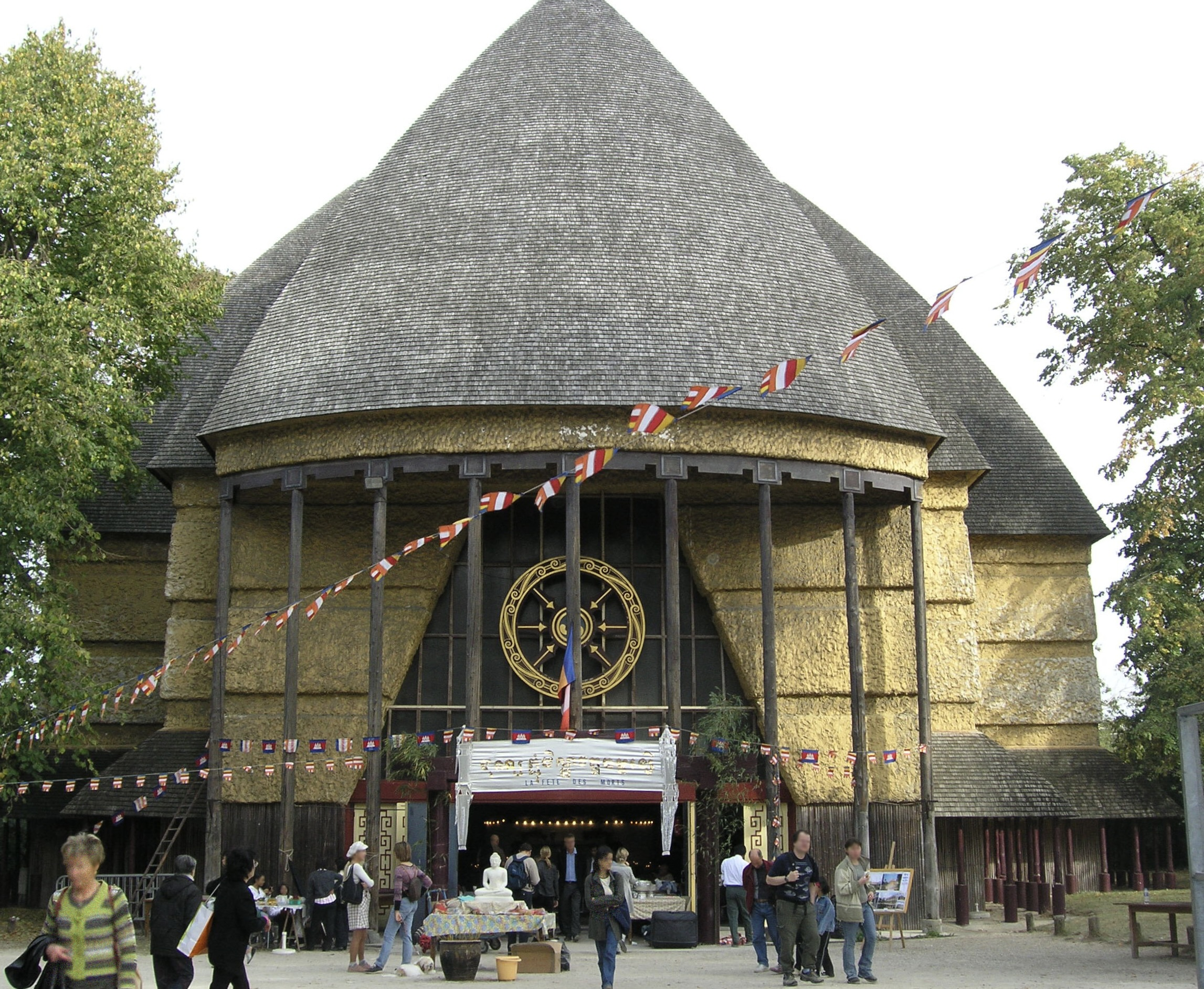
The Pagoda in the Bois de Vincennes, Paris

Although there was regular contact between practising Buddhists and Europeans in antiquity the former had little direct impact. In the latter half of the 19th century, Buddhism came to the attention of Western intellectuals and during the course of the following century the number of adherents has grown. There are now between one and four million Buddhists in Europe, the majority in Italy, Germany, Hungary, France and the United Kingdom.

== Early history ==
European contact with Buddhism first began after Alexander the Great's invasion of northwestern India in the 3rd century BC. Greek colonists in the region adopted Indian Buddhism and syncretized it with aspects of their own culture to make Greco-Buddhism, which developed between the 4th century BC and the 5th century AD in Bactria and the Indian subcontinent. Emperor Ashoka The Great sent Buddhist missionaries to the Hellenistic world, where they established centers in places such as Alexandria on the Caucasus, creating a noted presence in the region.

== Modern history ==
An interest in Buddhism had been circling among academic circles in modern Europe since the 1870s, with philosophers like Arthur Schopenhauer and Friedrich Nietzsche and esoteric-minded scholars such as Helena Blavatsky.

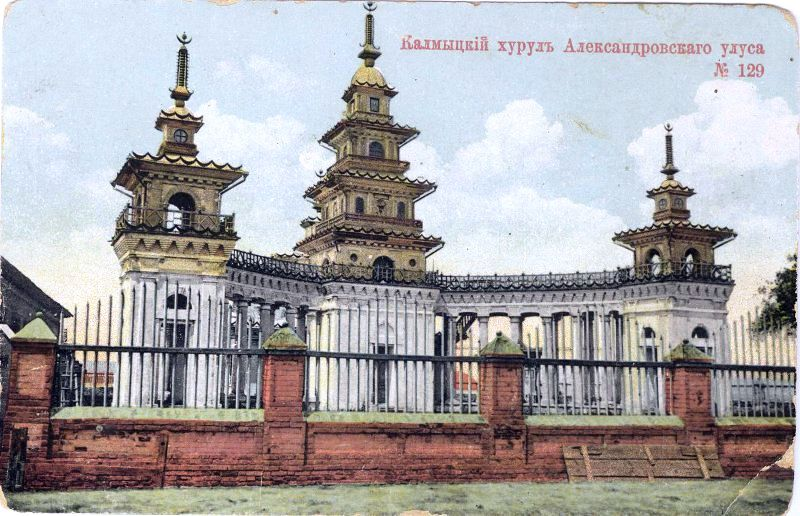
Khosheutovsky khurul - lithograph by an unknown artist from the 1840s

Russia, Austria and Italy are the only three European states today that recognize Buddhism as an "official", though not necessarily "state religion" in their respective countries. Hungary also recognizes Buddhism. There are five state-recognized Buddhist churches and one of Europe's largest stupa. On top of that, Russia also recognizes it, along with Islam, Judaism, and Orthodox Christianity, as native to Russian soil in the 1993 Constitution of the Russian Federation. Apart from Siberian Buddhist nations, the Kalmyk people's 17th century migration into Europe has made them today's only traditionally Buddhist nation west of the Ural. They now live in the Republic of Kalmykia, a Russian Republic.

== Major Buddhist temples in Europe ==
=== Western Europe ===
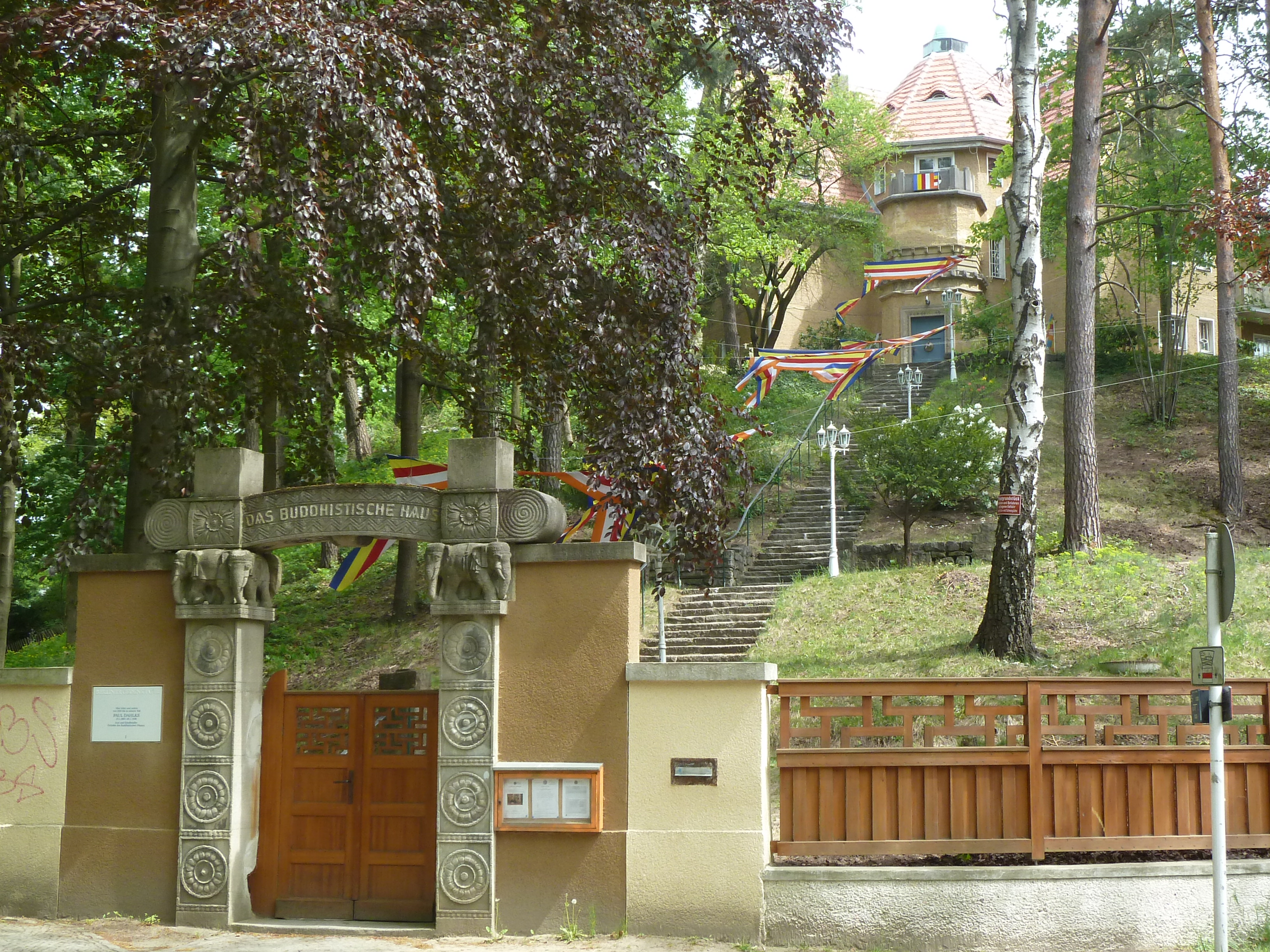
Das Buddhistische Haus

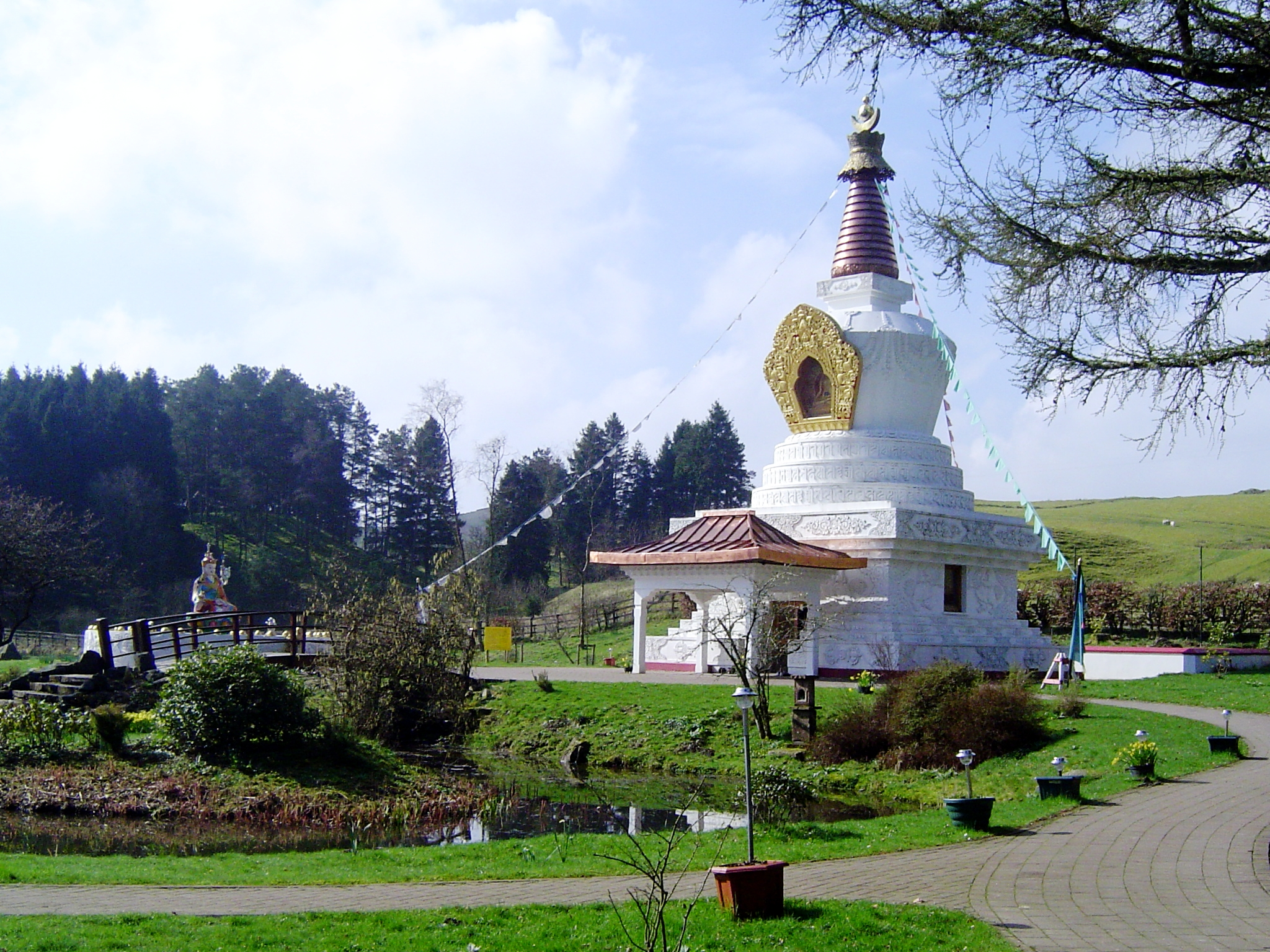
The main stupa at Samyé Ling

Das Buddhistische Haus (English: Berlin Buddhist Vihara, literally the Buddhist house) is a Theravada Buddhist temple complex (Vihara) in Frohnau, Berlin, Germany. It is considered to be the oldest and largest Theravada Buddhist center in Europe and has been declared a National Heritage site. The main building of Das Buddhistische Haus was designed by the architect Max Meyer for Dr. Paul Dahlke, a German physician who had undertaken a number of trips to Ceylon prior to World War I and became a Buddhist. It incorporates elements of Buddhist culture from several Buddhist traditions and was completed in 1924. Under Dahlke's direction it became a center of Buddhism in Germany. After the war Asoka Weeraratna, founder of the German Dharmaduta Society, became aware of its existence. In December 1957 he bought the building converted it into a Buddhist Vihara. Missionary Buddhist (Dhammaduta) monks, primarily from Sri Lanka, have come to stay at the Haus since 1957. It has now become an important center for spreading the teachings of the Buddha in Western Europe.

In 1982 Vietnamese monk Thich Nhat Hanh and his colleague Sister Chân Không founded Plum Village Monastery (Làng Mai), a monastery and Practice Center in the Dordogne in the south of France. Since the mid 60s he has headed a monastic and lay group, the Order of Inter-Being, teaching the Five and Fourteen Mindfulness Trainings and "Engaged Buddhism." The Plum Village Community of Engaged Buddhism (formerly known as the Unified Buddhist Church) is the legally recognized governing body for Plum Village (Làng Mai) in France.

The Four Dhagpo in France: Since its simple beginnings at Dhagpo Kagyu Ling in 1976, the mandala of the Karma Kagyu lineage in Europe has expanded in accordance with specific instructions left behind by the 16th Gyalwa Karmapa. Placing Gendun Rinpoche in charge and appointing Jigme Rinpoche as his European representative, Gyalwa Karmapa said it was necessary to build a center open to the public, a library, a university, a monastic hermitage and a retreat centre, if an authentic transmission and long term preservation of the Dharma were to take place. Since then Dhagpo Kagyu Ling, Dhagpo Kundreul Ling, Dhagpo Dargye Ling, Dhagpo Dedreul Ling have the role of preserving and transmitting the Buddha's teachings. Together they form a unified whole in which each centre complements the activity of the three others.

Lerab Ling is a Tibetan Buddhist centre founded in 1992 by Sogyal Rinpoche near Lodève in Languedoc-Roussillon, France. It was officially inaugurated by the Dalai Lama in 2008 at a ceremony attended by Carla Bruni-Sarkozy.

Diamond Way Buddhism founded by Hannah Nydahl and Ole Nydahl under the guidance of Trinley Thaye Dorje have undertaken large projects in Western Europe, including "Europe Center" in the German Alps, a 50 hectare historic property that hosts 4000 Buddhists during summer courses; Karma Berchen Ling in Greece where a Kalachakra Stupa was inaugurated in 2010 by Lama Chogdrup Dorje and Ole Nydahl; and Karma Guen in Spain where the first Kalachakra Stupa was built in Europe. In 1994, Lopon Tsechu Rinpoche inaugurated this Stupa together with Ole Nydahl.

=== Eastern and Central Europe ===
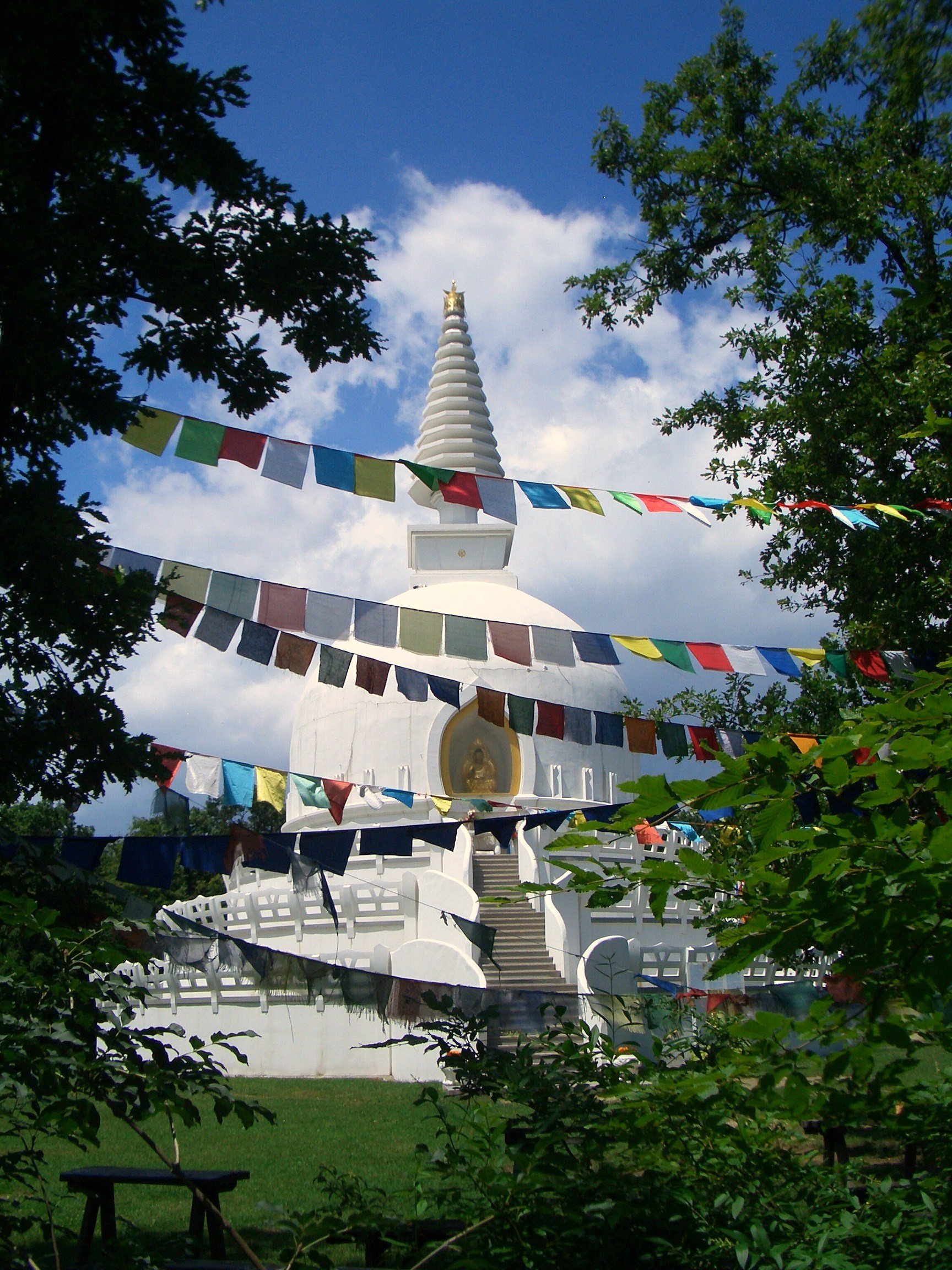
The 30-meter-high stupa in Zalaszántó, Hungary

The largest temple in eastern Europe is the Golden Temple in Elista, the capital of Kalmykia, which was opened in December 2005. Kalmykia is the only Buddhist majority region in Europe. The highest stupa in the area is the 30-meter-high stupa in Zalaszántó, Hungary.

=== Northern Europe ===
Samyé Ling monastery in Scotland, which celebrated its 40th anniversary in 2007, includes the largest Buddhist temple in western Europe. There is an associated community on Holy Isle which is owned by Samyé Ling who belong to the Kagyu school of Tibetan Buddhism. The settlements on the island include the Centre for World Peace and Health and a retreat centre for nuns. Samyé Ling has also established centres in more than 20 countries, including Belgium, Ireland, Poland, South Africa, Spain and Switzerland.

The first stupa of Northern Europe was built by Vello Vaartnou and Estonian Buddhist Brotherhood (also Estonian Nyingma) in 1983 in Estonia. In 1984-85 three more stupas were built, and in 2009, the 5th stupa in Estonia (10 m high) was built by Vaartnou and Estonian Nyingma Buddhists.

=== Southern Europe ===
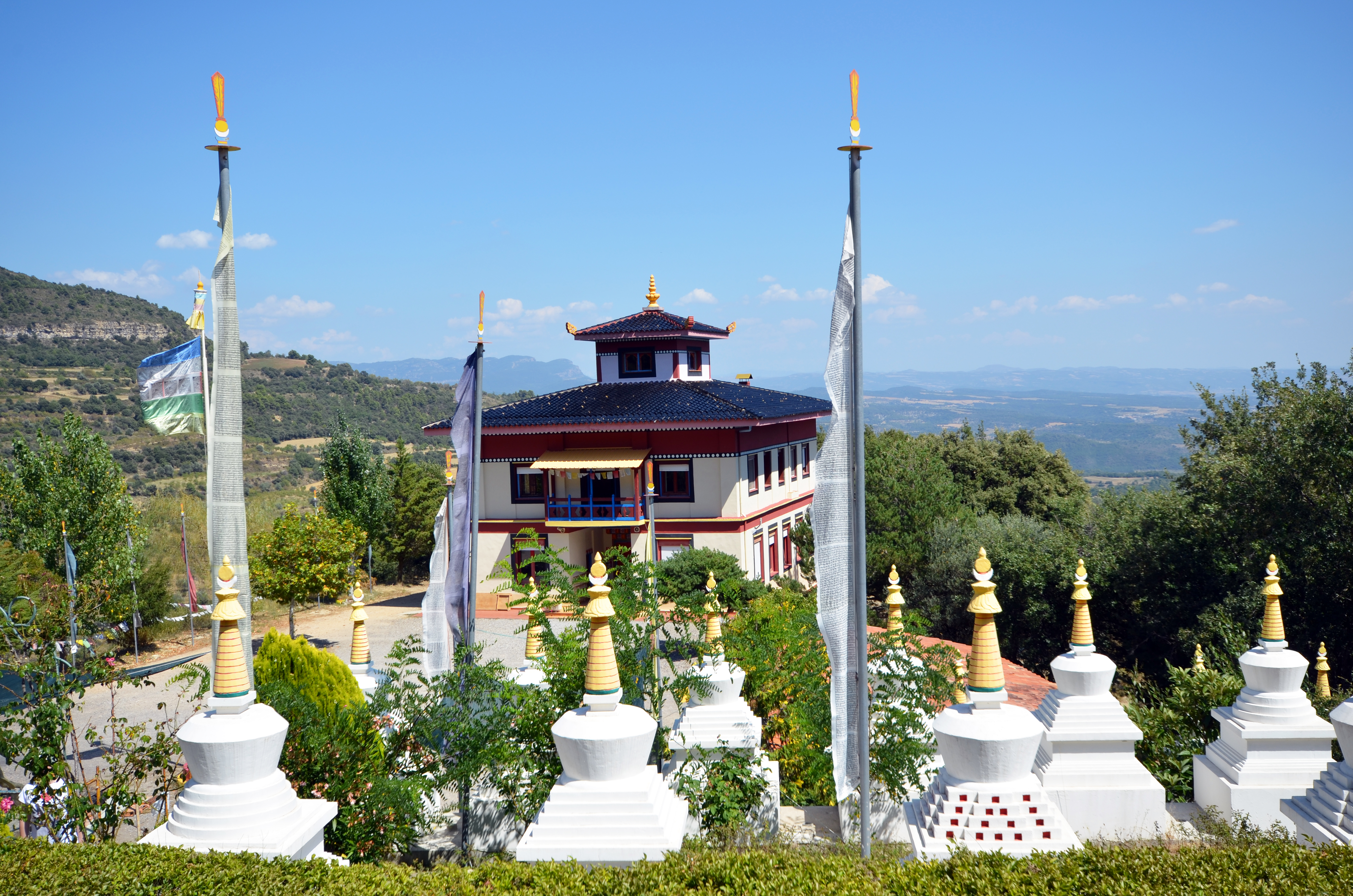
Dag Shang Kagyü, Aragón (Spain)

In Spain, Buddhism began to become visible in the late 1970s, brought from other parts of Europe, especially France. In 2007, the Government of Spain recognized Buddhism as notorio arraigo ("notorious rooted" religion), obtaining official consideration. The first schools in the country were Zen (thanks to Maestro Antonio Shoten Orellana, who founded the first center, Dojo Zen in Seville, 1976, Dokushô Villalba, Denkō Mesa, and other monks) and Kagyu (from Akong Rinpoche's visit to Barcelona in 1977, invited by Lama Tsondru Zangmo). Currently, the Buddhist schools with the most presence in Spain are Tibetan Buddhism in first place (64,20%), and Zen in second place (23,30%). In 2013 were estimated 40,000 assiduous practitioners of Buddhism in Spain.

Also in 1977 there was the first visit to Ibiza by the lamas Thubten Yeshé and Zopa Rinpoche, promoters of the network of Tibetan centers of the Gelugpa school, who took the name of Nagarjuna.

There are several centers in all the big cities of the country. In the mountains of the Aragonese Pyrenees is Dag Shang Kagyü (DSK), a monastery founded by Kalu Rinpoche in 1984. Sakya Tashi Ling is a monastery located near Barcelona, founded in 1977. In 1998 the Samye Dechi Ling monastery was founded in the province of Girona. The O Sel Ling monastery is located on the southern slope of Sierra Nevada, Granada. In all of them it is allowed to practice the long term retreats.

The first stupa to be built in Spain was the O Sel Ling stupa in 1990. With 33 m (108 feet) high, in 2003 the Enlightenment Stupa was built as the final project of Teacher Lopon Tsechu Rinpoche. Both stupas are located in Andalusia.

The International Center for Buddhist Studies near Pedreguer in the Alicante region of Spain, built in 2006, is a Sakya Buddhist monastery. It is managed by the Sakya Foundation and led by the Sakya Trizin. The resident teacher at the monastery is Ngawang Lekshe Rinchen Gyaltsen. It is worth highlighting Ediciones Dharma, the main Buddhist publishing house in Spain.

In Italy there's a vast representation of Buddhist traditions: most of them are registered with the Unione Buddista Italiana. Historically Asia has been a major object of interest both for the Catholic church (i.e. the Jesuit Asia missions) and the Italian merchants (i.e. Marco Polo) which made Buddhism a major academic topic for a long time. For these reasons in 1732 the Università degli Studi di Napoli "L'Orientale" was founded in Naples, specifically focusing on Asia: still today is one of the world most prestigious Universities on the topic. Buddhism as a religion has begun finding some roots in Italy since the 1930s thanks to the work of the great tibetologist Giuseppe Tucci. In 1960 Tucci brought to Italy the Tibetan tulku Chögyal Namkhai Norbu Rinpoche to teach Tibetan language at "L'Orientale" University. Years later the same Tibetan Lama established his own Dharma center in Tuscany naming it Merigar, of international renown. Tuscany also host the Istituto Lama Tsong Khapa, another very important international Buddhist center under the patronage of Lama Zopa Rinpoche, attracting in the area Buddhist leaders like the XIV Dalai Lama and academic scholars interested in the dialogue with Buddhism (i.e. B. Alan Wallace's CCR). Many other Buddhist traditions have established in Italy in the last 40 years, from Theravada (i.e. Santacittarama) to Zen, etc.

== See also ==
- Buddhism in the West
- Buddhism by country
- Buddhism in Kalmykia
- Buddhist modernism

== Bibliography ==
- Baumann, Martin (2001). Global Buddhism: Developmental Periods, Regional Histories, and a New Analytical Perspective, Journal of Global Buddhism 2, 1-43
- Johnson, Todd M.; Grim, Brian J. (2013). The World's Religions in Figures: An Introduction to International Religious Demography (PDF). Hoboken, NJ: Wiley-Blackwell. pp. 34–36. Archived from the original (PDF) on 20 October 2013.
- Offermanns, J. (2005). Debates on atheism, quietism, and sodomy: the initial reception of Buddhism in Europe. Journal of Global Buddhism 6, 16-35
- Koné, A. (2001). Zen in Europe: a survey of the territory. Journal of Global Buddhism 2, 139-161
