= Kalachakra Stupa (Greece) =

Buddhist stupa in southern Greece

Coordinates: 38.057409°N 22.440402°E

Kalachakra Stupa is a stupa located just outside Lagkadaiika village, in the Xylokastro area of the Corinthia region of southern Greece, overlooking the Gulf of Corinth. It is the largest stupa in Southeastern Europe.

== Overview ==
Kalachkra Stupa was created to protect against negative energies. It is a rare kind of stupa, with only a few existing in the world. One of them is the Benalmádena Stupa, built in 1994 at the retreat place Karma Guen in Spain by Lama Lopon Tsechu Rinpoche. It is located within the Karma Berchen Ling Buddhist centre.

== Construction and inauguration ==
The Kalachakra Stupa in Karma Berchen Ling was built under the spiritual guidance of Lama Chogdrup Dorje with the help and support of more than 1,000 friends from all over the world. It was inaugurated in August 2010, by Lama Chogdrup Dorje and Lama Ole Nydahl, fulfilling the wish and completing the project of Lopon Tsechu Rinpoche.
