= Pigeon Park =

Pigeon Park may refer to:

- The grounds of St Philip's Cathedral, Birmingham, England
- Parque de la Paloma, in Benalmádena, Málaga, Spain
- Pigeon Park, Karangahape Road, Auckland, New Zealand
- Te Aro Park, Wellington, New Zealand
