= Castillo de Colomares =

20th century monument castle in Spain

- Castillo de Colomares
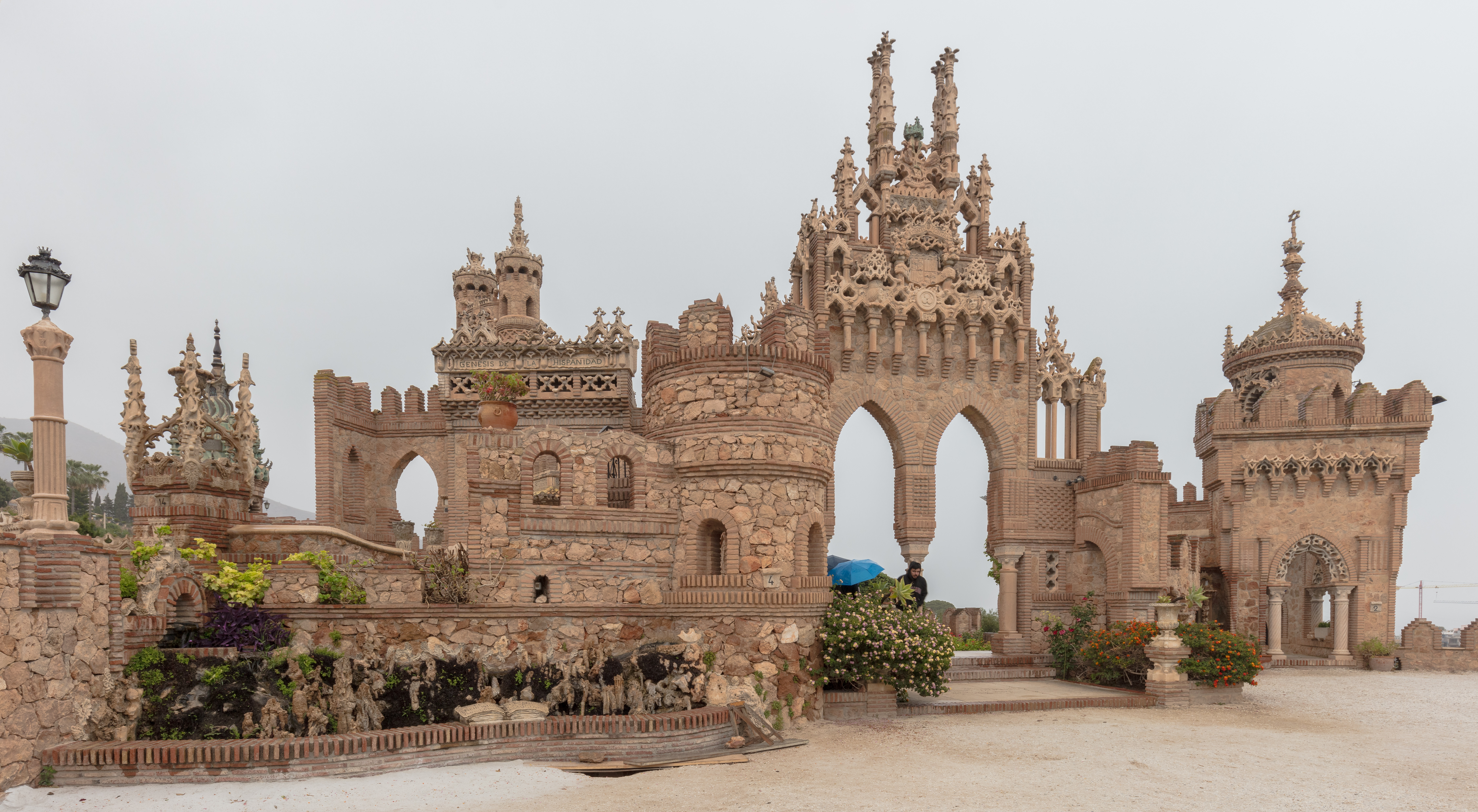
- Castillo de Colomares, Benalmádena
- Interactive map of Castillo de Colomares
- Location: Benalmádena, Spain
- Coordinates: 36.5906°N 4.5725°W
- Beginning date: 1987
- Completion date: 1994
- Dedicated to: Christopher Columbus

Castillo de Colomares is a monument, in the form of a castle, dedicated to the life and adventures of Christopher Columbus. It was built near Benalmádena in Spain, between 1987 and 1994 primarily by Dr. Esteban Martín y Martín but with the help of two local bricklayers. Covering an area of approximately 1,500 square meters, it is the largest monument in the world to the explorer. It also contains the smallest church in the world, covering an area of just 1.96 square meters.

Dr. Martín y Martín began this work in an improvised way using brick, stone and cement. Employing his knowledge of art, history and architecture, Dr. Martín worked to develop the monument into a "unicum" that he believes narrates the Discovery of America.

== History ==
The text in this paragraph was written by the creator of the monument, Esteban Martin Martin. It mainly illustrates his views and opinions instead of historical facts.

Columbus was a great navigator, illustrated in geography, astronomy, Holy Scripture, mathematics, humanities, etc. Seven years before the discovery, Columbus presented his plan to other States and only the Catholic Monarchs accepted it.

He needed marine experts for his companies and he managed to find them in Palos de la Frontera, Huelva province. It was Martín Alonso Pinzón who managed to get those true "sea lions" to accompany the Admiral. There is placed the head of a horse in bronze as a symbol of that great Huelva sailor in the manner of a Pegasus or mythical horse.

It was the crown of Castile and its Queen Isabel who helped him and believed in him, and there are his shields also in bronze in gratitude and perpetual recognition.

They left Palos on August 3, 1492, there were 96 crew members, almost all from Andalusia, and after a few days of provisioning and repairing their ships in the Canary Islands, they left for the unknown and reached an island 33 days later. It was the day of the Pilar on October 12, 1492. The island was baptized with the name of SAN SALVADOR, and the natives called it “Island of the Iguanas”. In the Castle there is a small oratory with the image of our Lord Salvador and a sailor bell accompanies it in memory of the Island.

The three ships that Columbus used in his journey are represented, the Niña, the Pinta and the Santa María in this Castle Monument. La Niña at the top of the building, under the arch of La Rabida, the Monastery that sheltered Columbus when he arrived from Portugal. La Pinta, on the main facade, this being the nave of the Pinzones brothers, with the Pegasus horse, which supports it. The Santa María, isolated from the other two, as this ship suffered an accident and sank on Christmas Day, in Santo Domingo. The crew, who were of the order of 39 sailors, stayed on the island and did not return to Spain, as they died at the hands of the indigenous people.

Columbus died after making four trips and in the Castillo Monumento Colomares there is a mausoleum with a Gothic rose window. It is his fifth trip to Eternity, and his remains rest no one knows where and no one knows where he was born for sure.

It was Spain and Andalusia in particular who starred in that discovery that undoubtedly changed the world, for the better according to some and for the worse to others.

== Gallery ==
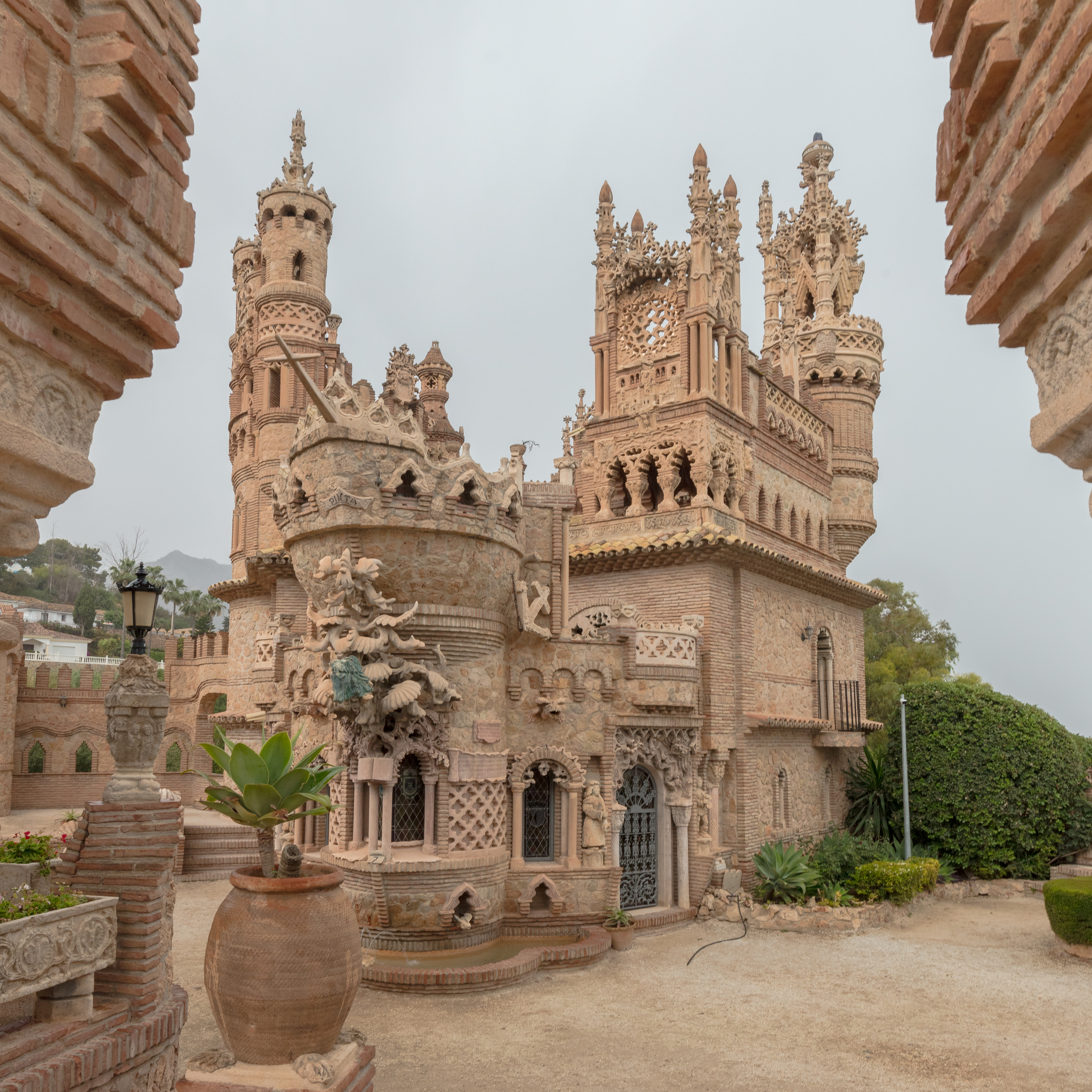

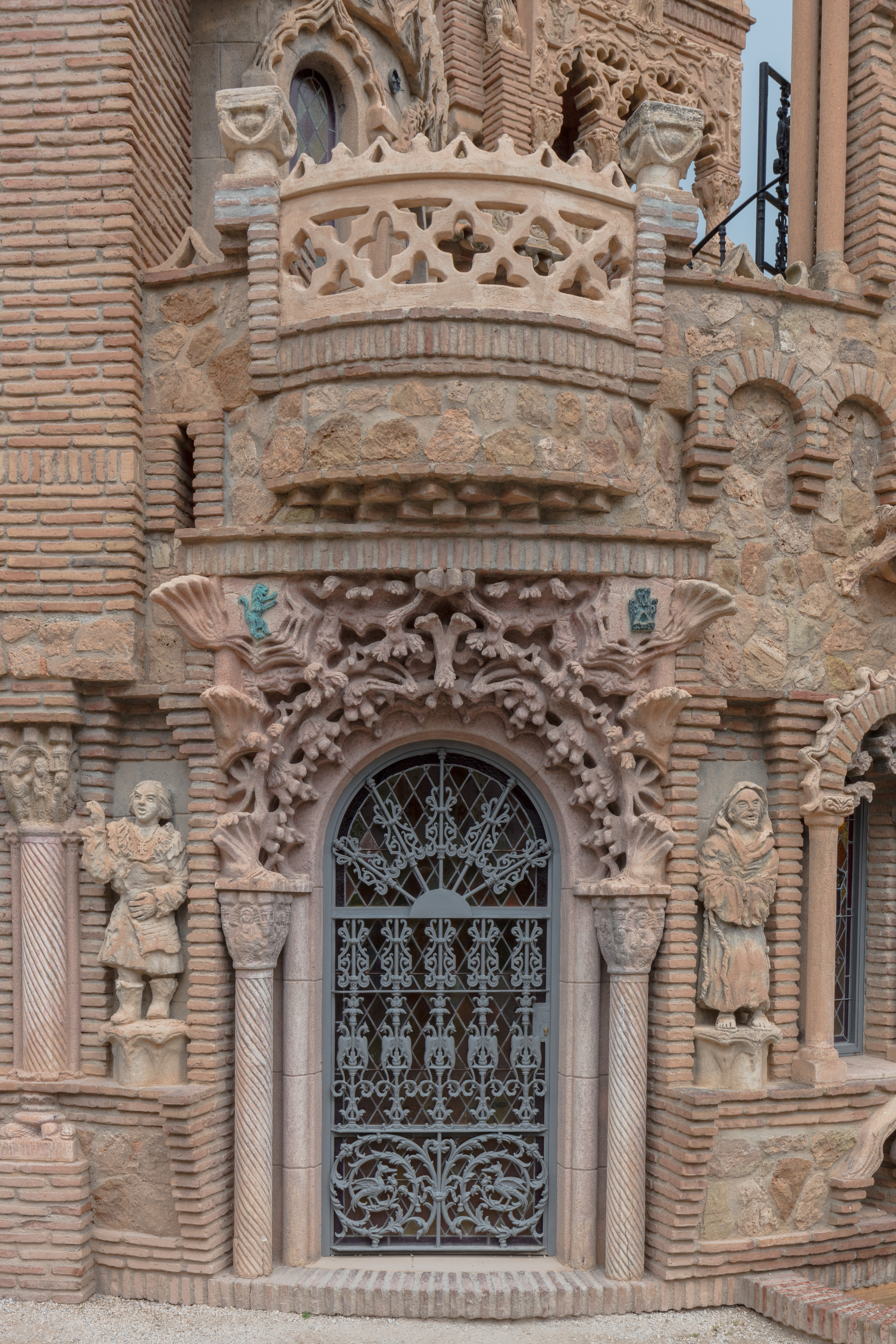

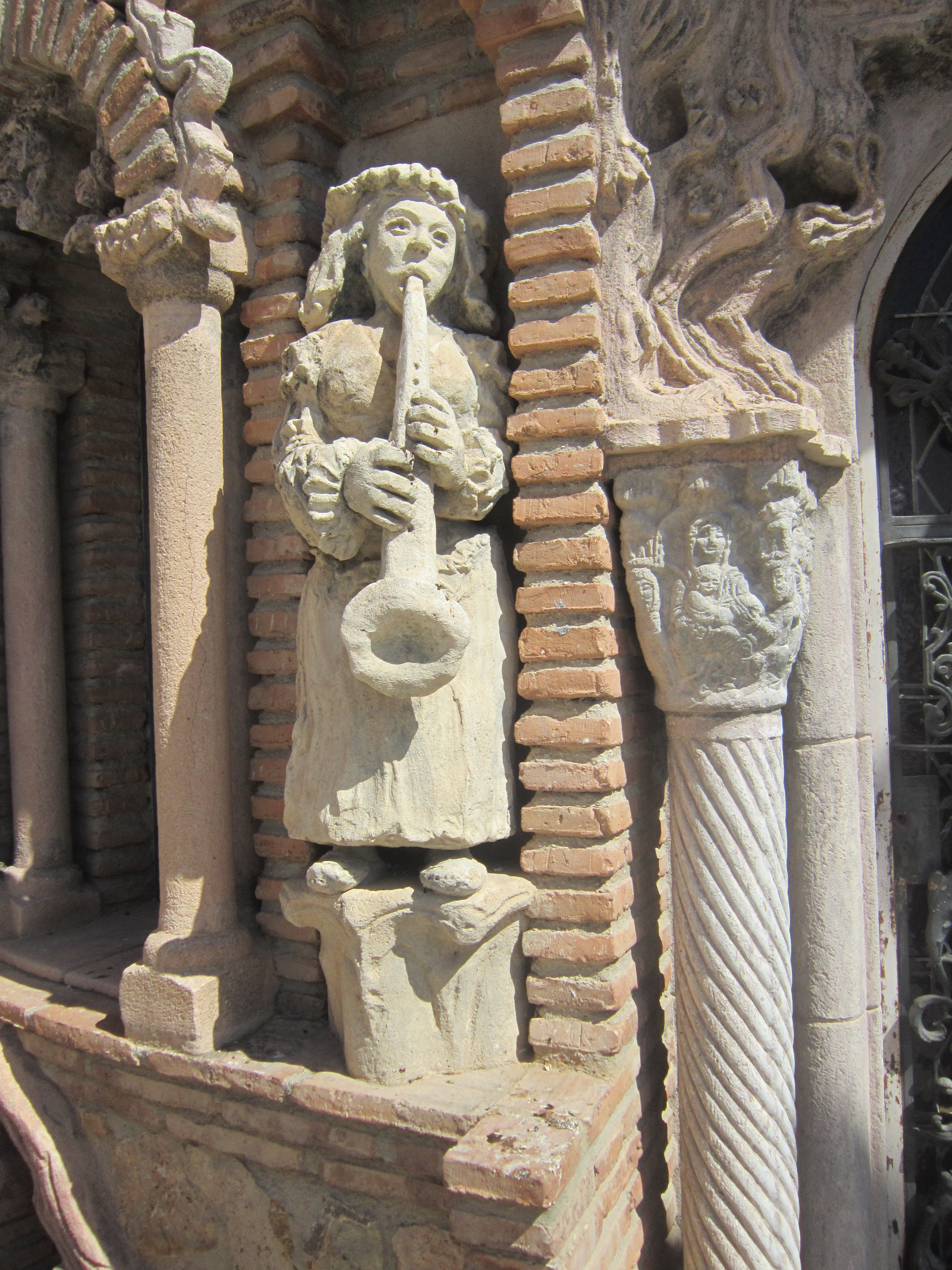

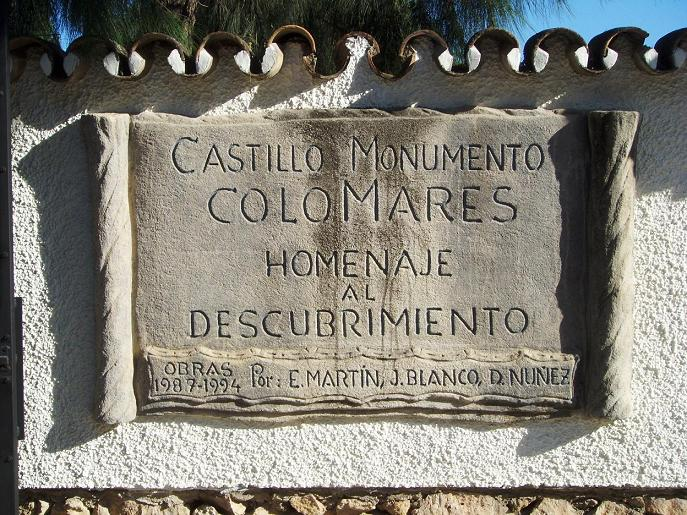

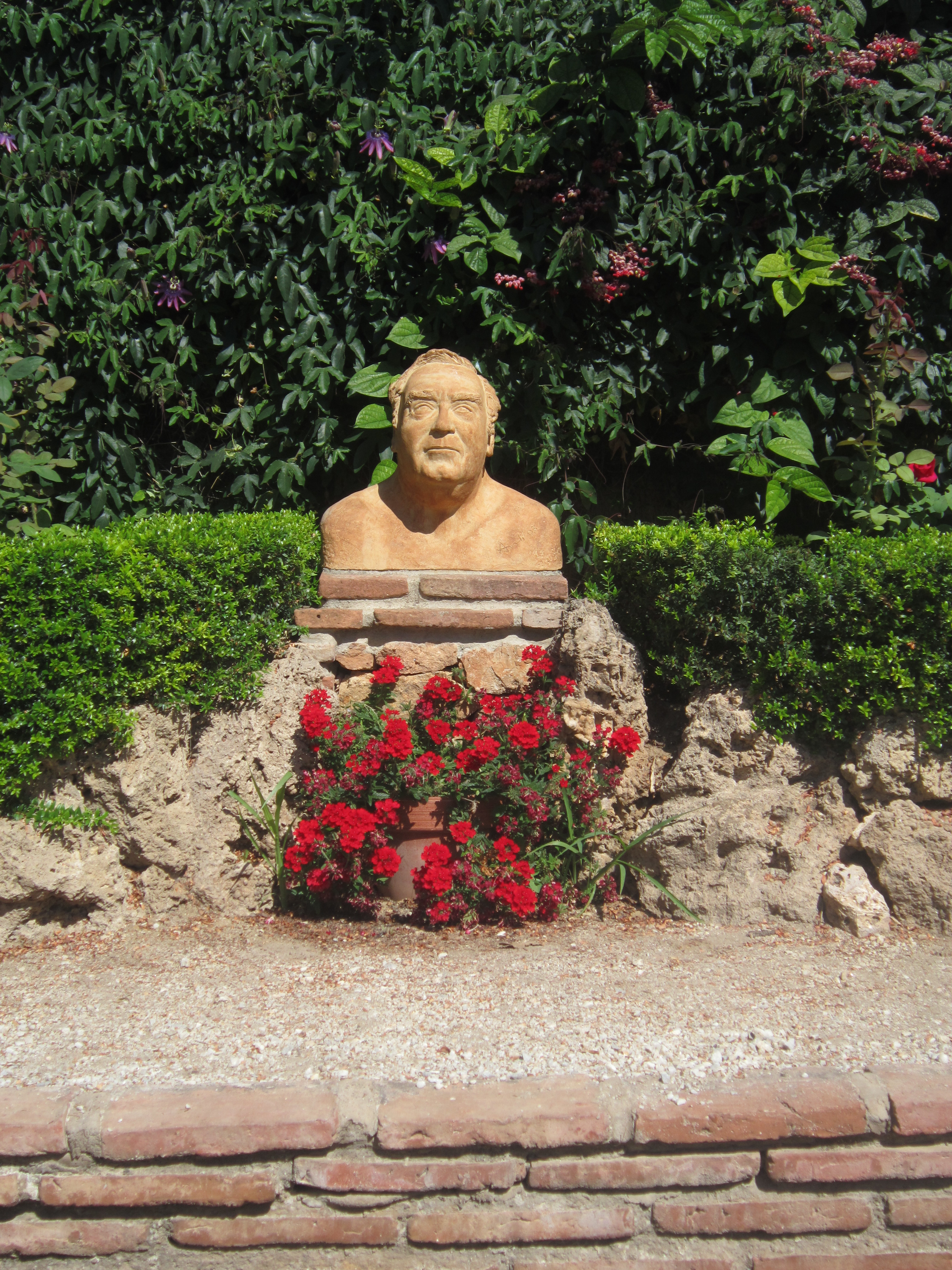
