= Benalmádena =

- Municipality
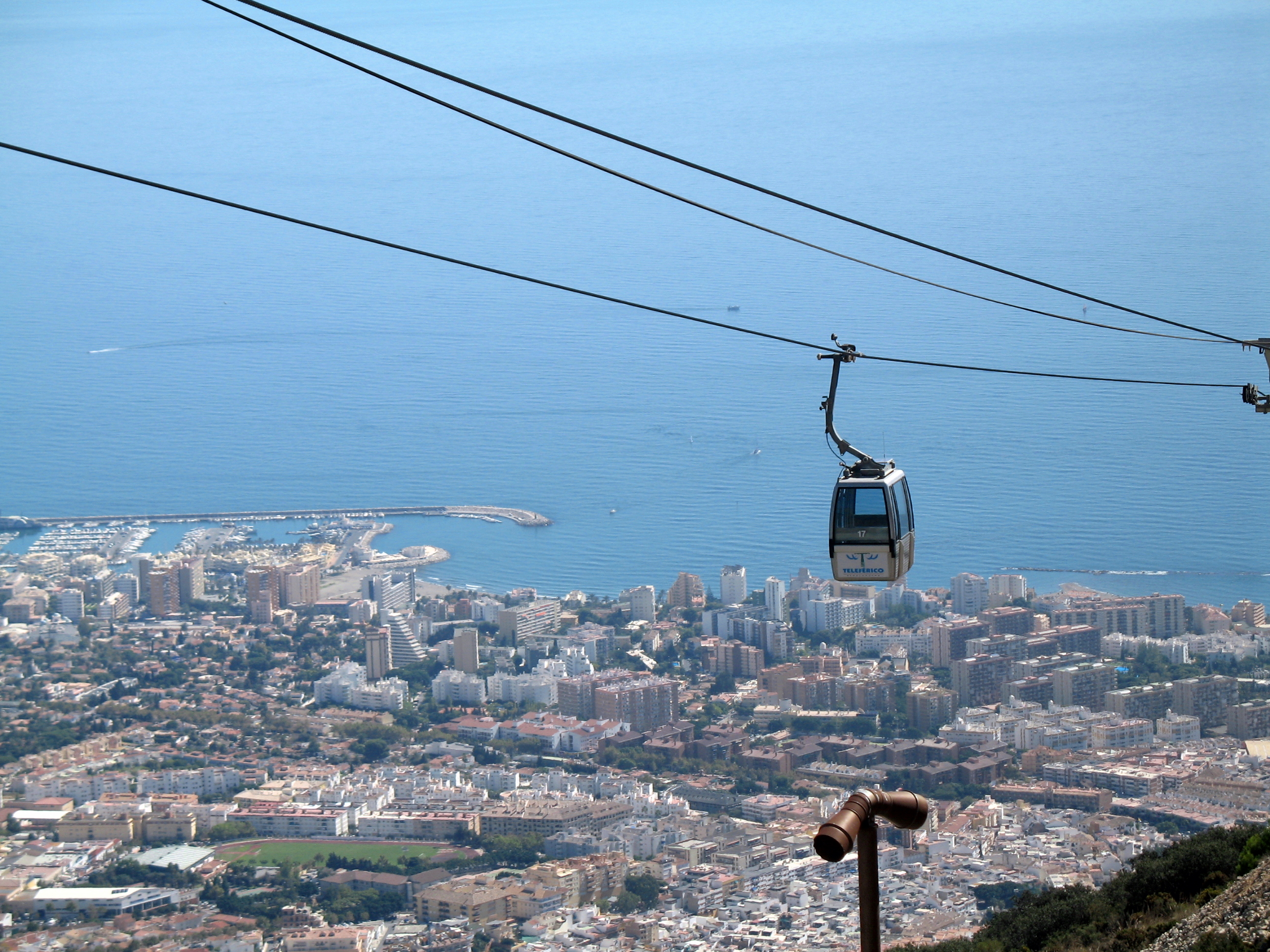
- Benalmádena Cable Car

- Flag Coat of arms

- Benalmádena shown within Málaga

- Benalmádena shown within Andalusia
- Coordinates: 36°36′N 4°31′W
- Sovereign state: Spain
- Autonomous community: Andalusia
- Province: Málaga
- Comarca: Costa del Sol Occidental
- Administrative HQ: Benalmádena

Government
  - Type: Municipal corporation
  - Body: Ayuntamiento de Benalmádena
  - Mayor: Derrick Brown

Area
  - Total: 27.2 km^{2} (10.5 sq mi)

Population (2025-01-01)
  - Total: 78,338
  - Density: 2,880/km^{2} (7,460/sq mi)
- Demonym: Benalmadenses
- Time zone: UTC+1 (Central European Time)
  - Summer (DST): UTC+2 (Central European Summer Time)
- Postal codes: 29630; 29631; 29639
- Dialling code: 95
- Website: www.benalmadena.es

Benalmádena (Spanish pronunciation: [benalˈmaðena]) is a town in Andalusia in southern Spain, 12 km west of Málaga, on the Costa del Sol between Torremolinos and Fuengirola.

Benalmádena is rich in attractive beaches and interesting places like the Colomares Castle, the 33-metre-tall Buddhist Benalmádena Stupa, the largest Buddhist stupa in Europe, the Benalmádena Marina and the Benalmádena Cable Car.

Benalmádena covers an area of just over 27 km^{2} that extends from the summits of the Sierra de Mijas to the sea, falling in some places as a cliff. The territory is crossed from east to west on Highway A-7, which connects with the provincial capital and other centres of the Mediterranean coast.

With 61,383 inhabitants according to the INE census of 2010, Benalmádena is the eighth most populous municipality in the province and the third largest metropolitan area, behind Málaga and Torremolinos. The population is concentrated in three main centers: Benalmádena Pueblo, Arroyo de la Miel and Benalmádena Costa, although the high urban growth and demographic tends to unify the three cores.

Benalmádena has been inhabited since prehistoric times. Benalmádena experienced a remarkable development during the period of Muslim domination. Its development was paralyzed after joining the Crown of Castile in 1485 due to various natural disasters and the intensity of the activity of privateers in the area. The paper industry and vineyard cultivation reactivated the local economy during the 18th and 19th centuries.

In the early 21st century Benalmádena is one of the main tourist destinations on the Costa del Sol, with leisure facilities including an amusement park, two aquariums, a casino, a cable car and one of the largest marinas of Andalusia.

== History ==
Historically the region has been occupied and settled by many cultures dating back to the Bronze Age, including the ancient Phoenicians and Romans, and has also been considerably influenced by the Moorish settlement of the southern Iberian Peninsula. Two Almenara towers on the coastline date back to the 15th century, originally built to guard the coast and its population from the frequent incursions of Barbary pirates in the years following the reconquista (reconquest) of the region by Henry IV of Castile.

In contemporary times, along with the rest of the Costa del Sol area it has become an important tourist destination. The municipality has been subject to an unprecedented urban expansion in recent years with many new buildings and homes built, sometimes causing environmental degradation.

Benalmádena has both a traditional Spanish village and a modern, coastal, tourist area.

=== Etymology ===
Many authors give theories about the origin of the name of the town, but none has been proven. The first documents which contain references to Benalmádena from the 15th century are in the context of the struggles of the Crown of Castile against the Nasrid Kingdom of Granada. The assumption on which most historians agree is the Arabic toponym of Ibn al-ma' din "son of the mines" for the iron and ochre bed found in the area. Another theory, also related to the Arabic word Bina al-ma'din, whose translation would be "the construction or building of the mine".

There are others theories such as the Arabic for "people between springs", Bena-A La Ena. Another suggestion is that name derives from Bina al-Madina, "the state of the al-Madina's family"; according to historical data they were a rich family of Muslim Málaga and could have owned the area. It has also been suggested that the name of the municipality referred to a lineage of the Madana, Ben al-Madana.

=== Before Roman Empire ===
The first human settlements in the area are from the Upper Palaeolithic, 20,000 years ago according to the finding of some caves located in the area: "Cueva del Toro", "Cueva del Botijo" and "Cueva de la Zorrera". In the 8th and 7th centuries BC the Phoenicians, were interested of the mining of the zone. the Phoenicians founded several colonies all along the Spanish coast. Romans replaced Phoenicians as traders and started to use the wealth of the Mediterranean. Among the Roman remains are the ruins of Benal-Roma, a salting factory located on the coast, the site of Torremuelle, and enamelware and other items preserved in the Museum of Benalmádena. The wine culture had great importance during the period of Roman domination.

=== Middle Ages ===
In the following centuries the area became depopulated. People sought refuge within Málaga's city walls from attacks and looting from the sea. The municipality was included in the Roman province of Baetica. It was later taken by Visigoths and Byzantines. After the Muslim invasion of the Iberian Peninsula, the area was greatly developed. In the 11th century, the population were concentrated into a walled town and a fortress, both located in "Benalmádena Pueblo". Muslims developed the agriculture and introduced sugar cane, figs, grapes and mulberry (used in the textile industry) from the East. Ibn al-Baitar, one of the most important botanists and pharmacologists of the Middle Ages, was born here in 1197.

=== Before French revolution ===
In 1456 the fort and the town were destroyed by Christian armies under the command of King Enrique IV of Castilla. The villagers took refuge in Mijas to rebuild their homes, which were destroyed again in 1485 by King Ferdinand the Catholic in his final conquest. Over the next six years the town was deserted. In 1491 the king ordered Alonso Palmero to colonise the area with thirty old Christians and Palmero as mayor, but an earthquake and the constant pirate attacks made it impossible to inhabit the town. It was in these times that the Arabic name became Castilianized and the town became Benalmaina.

=== Modern age ===
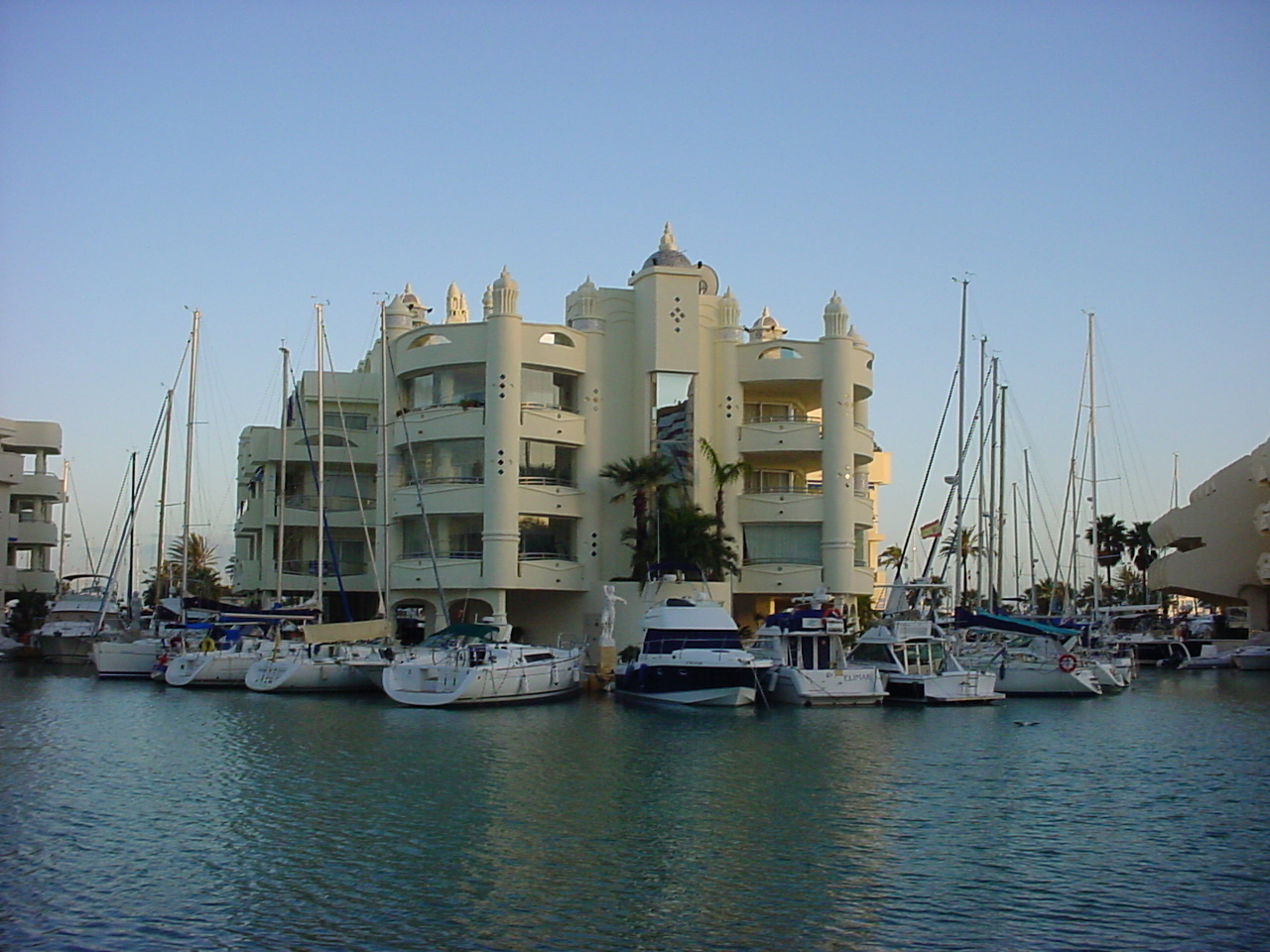
One of the 'floating houses' in Puerto Deportivo in Benalmádena

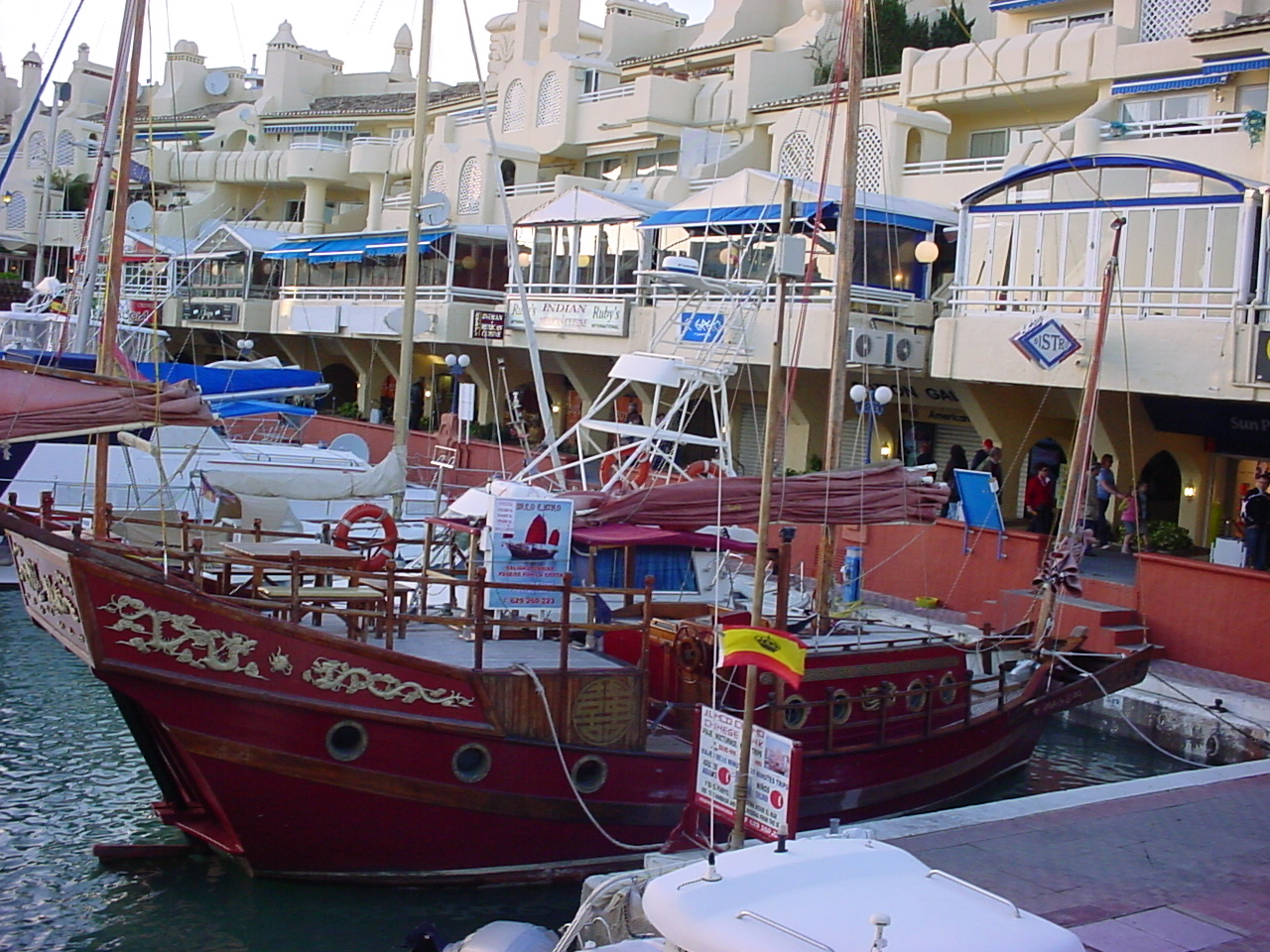
Chinese junk making trips for tourists in Benalmádena

In 1784 the Italian Félix Solesio purchased the farm "Arroyo de la Miel" to build six paper factories to supply the Royal Factory of Playing Cards of Macharaviaya. The destination for most production was the American market. This would mean the birth of the nucleus of Arroyo de la Miel around the new business and the factories built at what is now "Plaza de España", containing the "Portal de San Carlos" (San Carlos gate) with the arms of Solesio and the "La Tribuna" building. A monument to the founder of this complex was erected in the square. In the 19th century the city grew through the exploitation of muscatel grapes for the wine production, but the vine plague of phylloxera ruined crops across the province. Epidemics of malaria, typhoid and cholera also undermined the population. The municipality's population boom began in the 1950s with the birth and development of mass tourism on the Spanish coast. Many established hotels, restaurants and businesses opened in this period, such as the Hotel Triton (1961), Tivoli World amusement park (1973), Torrequebrada casino and hotel (1979), Selwo Aquarium, Sea Life Aquarium, Chollocasa, Cable car, Irentinsapain, Hotel Alay. Many more were constructed in the early 21st century.

== Geography ==
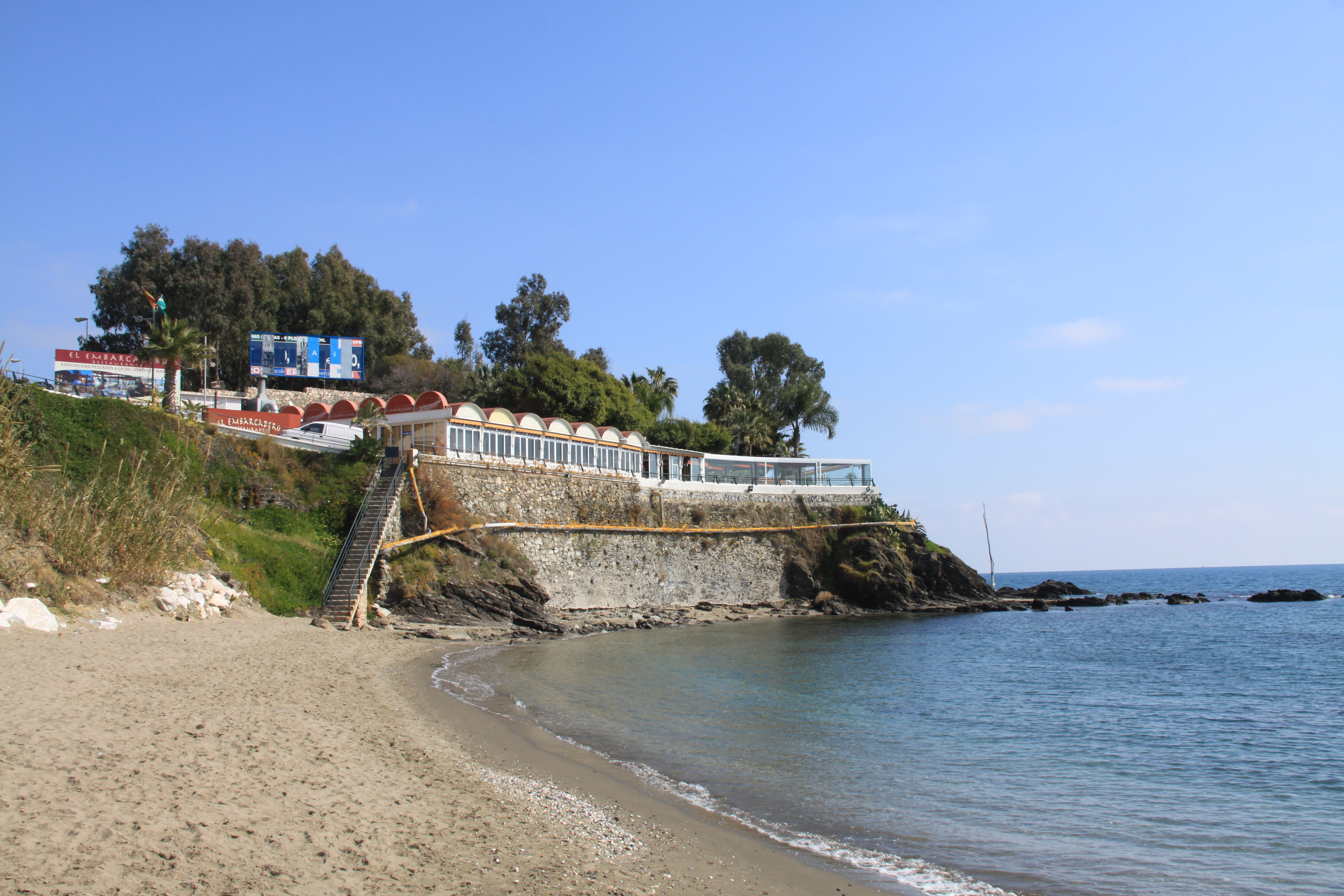
La Viborrilla Beach

The municipality has three main urban areas:

- Benalmádena Pueblo, the original village, which lies about three kilometres inland at an elevation of approximately 200 m above mean sea level. Its core consists of a typical white-fronted Andalusian village, although including numerous recent buildings in modern architectural styles. The town of Benalmádena also has an archaeological museum with locally derived artefacts dating back to the Bronze Age.
- Benalmádena Costa, an urban agglomeration on the coast. Here there are discos, hotels, beaches, shopping centers and an extensively-equipped marina. Tourist attractions include SeaLife aquarium and Selwo Marina, a theme park with dolphins, penguins and seals among other species. The Parque Paloma is a more recent addition to the attractions, a landscaped park containing a large lake and animals running wild.
- Arroyo de la Miel (Honey Stream), originally a separate village, is in the interior between the other two areas. It has become the main residential area, and is also the most commercially active. Buildings, many of them apartment blocks. are tightly packed. It has attractions such as the Tivoli World amusement park, and a teleferico (cable car) running to the summit of the 769-metre Calamorro mountain, which provides panoramic views of the Sierra Nevada, Gibraltar and, on clear days, the Moroccan coastline. The Friday market is a popular attraction.

=== Climate ===
The climate is typically Mediterranean, with mild temperatures throughout the year, no frost in the colder months, and an average temperature of 19 °C (66 °F). Its privileged climate and location in the southern coastal Europe are two important factors so that the tourism industry is the main economic sector of the municipality. The town has a nudist beach, Playa Nudista Benalnatura.

=== Flora and fauna ===
Benalmádena is a highly urbanised municipality except for the higher areas of the mountains, with few non-urban areas. In the mountains there are typical Mediterranean species such as the white deadnettle, rock rose, thyme, rosemary and marjoram lily like the turpentine tree, juniper and pine trees like pine, carob tree and wild olive.

Fauna includes mountain goat, genet, reptiles of various species, eagles, kestrels and owls. Whales and other marine life have been sighted along the coast.

== Main sights ==
The township of Benalmádena has the largest example of a Buddhist stupa in the Western world, Benalmádena Stupa, constructed in 2003.

In Arroyo de la Miel, Avenida Garcia Lorca has the Costa del Sol's only real ice skating rink.

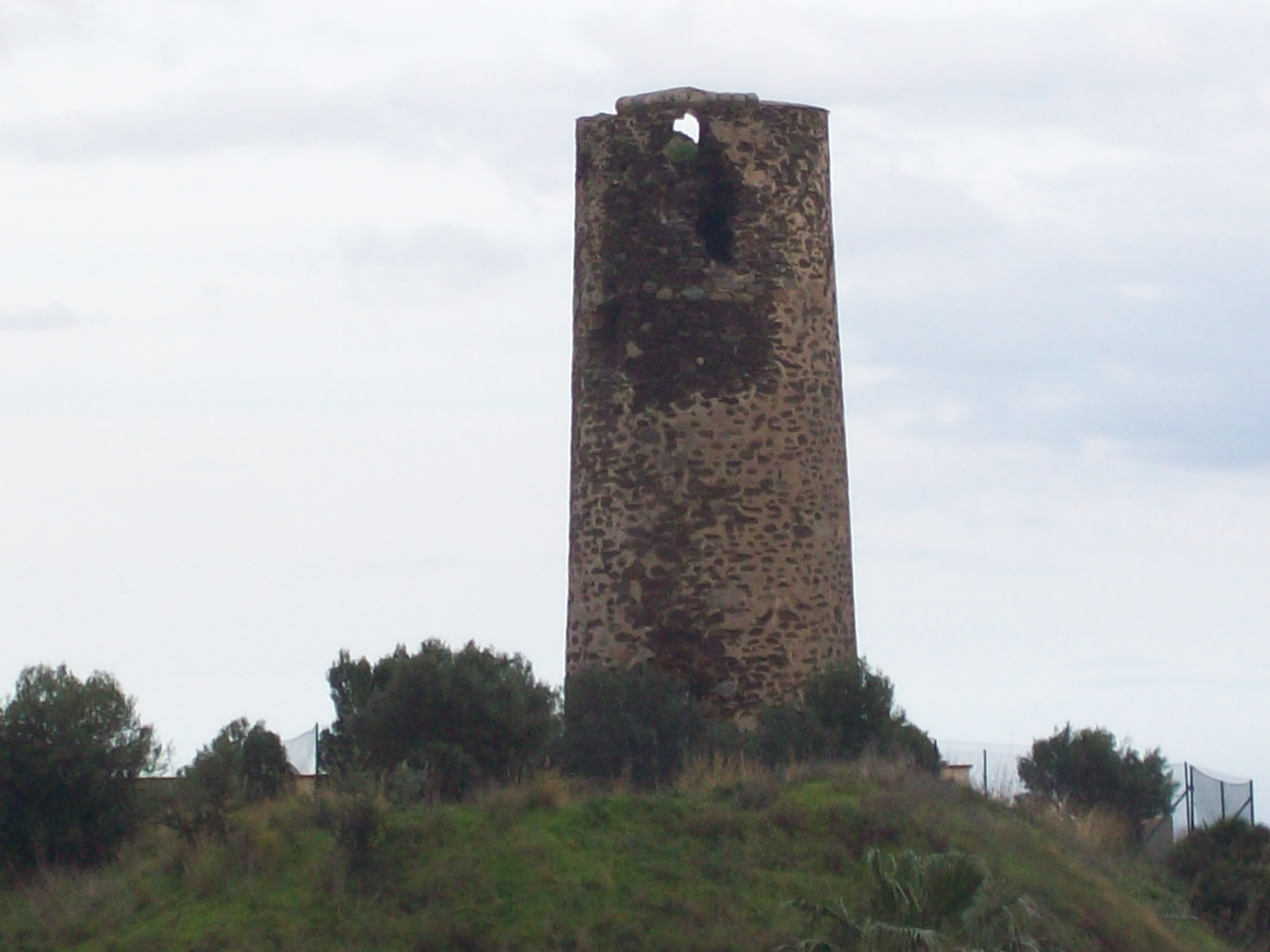
Torre Quebrada watchtower

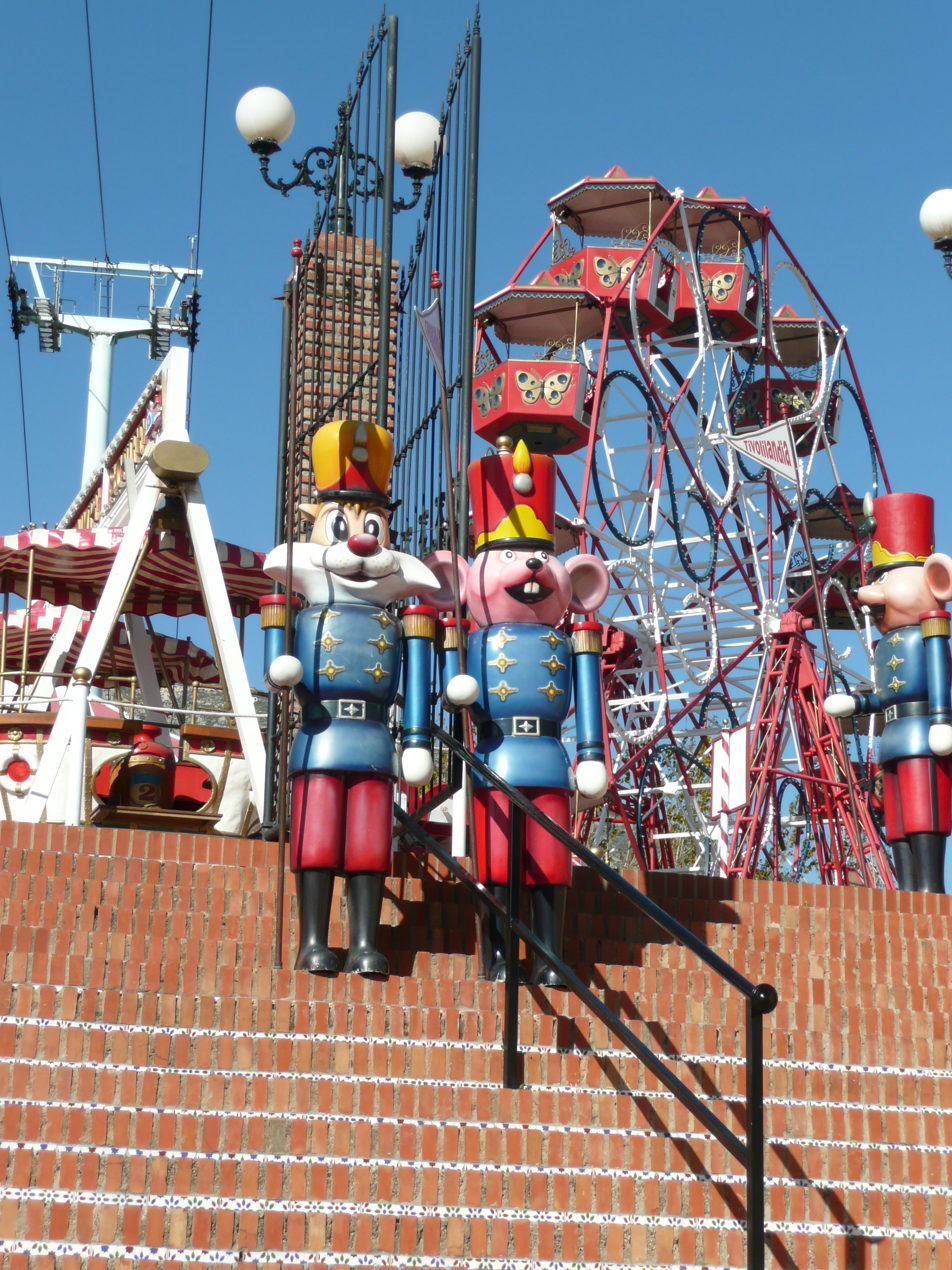
Tivoli World (closed since 2021)

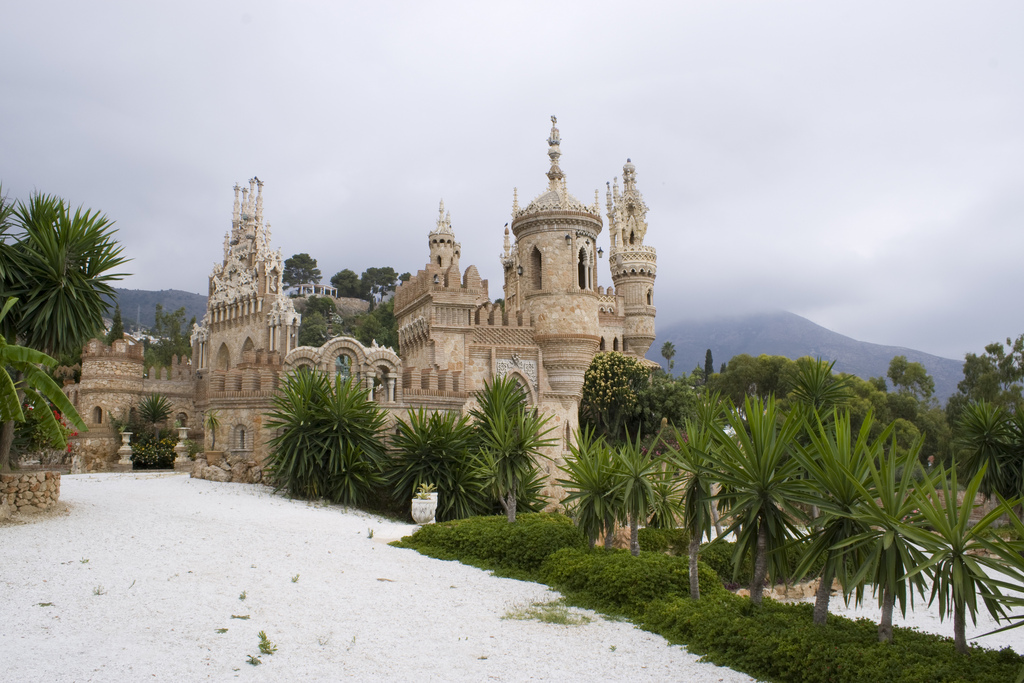
Colomares Castle

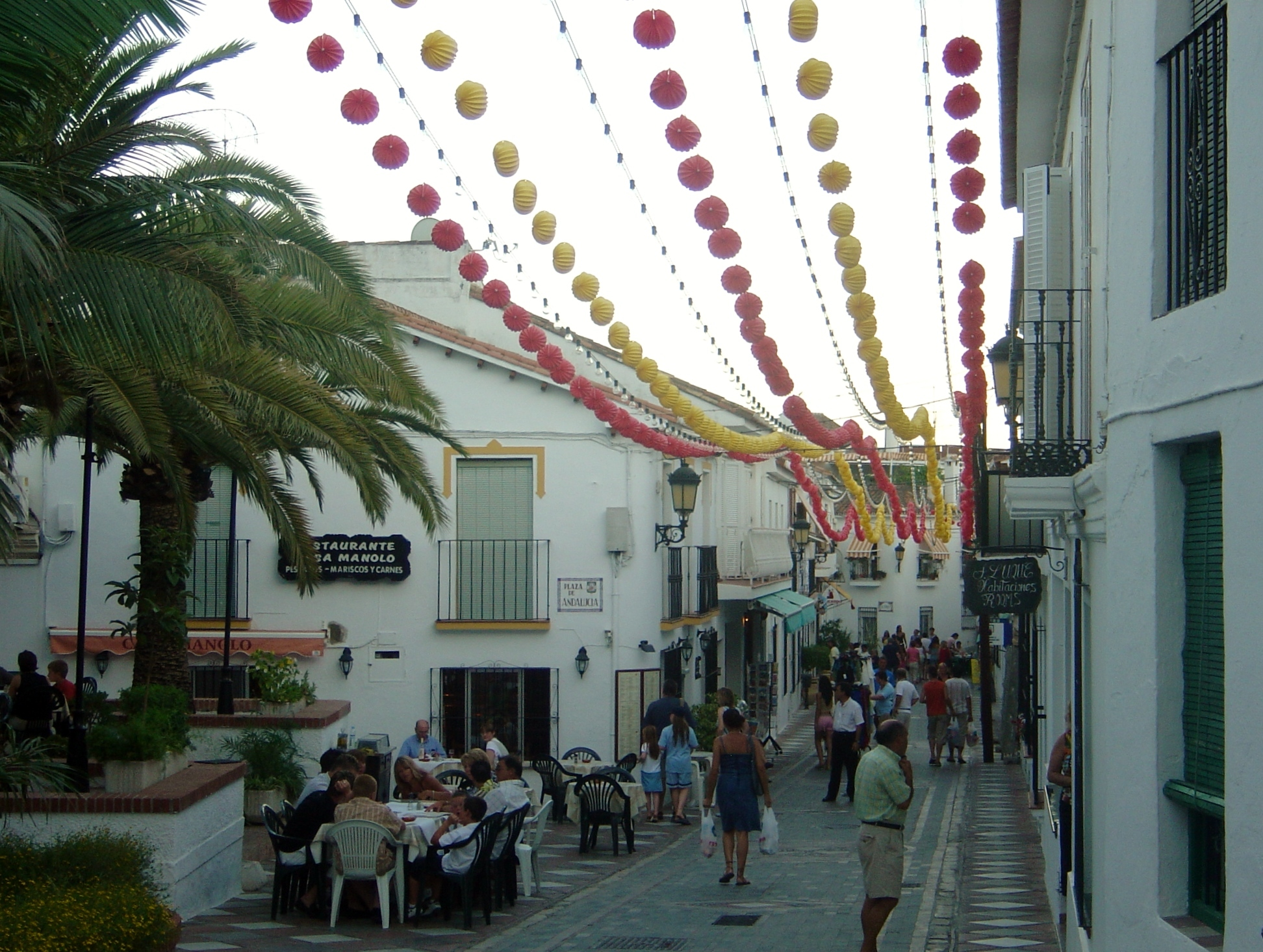
A street of the town

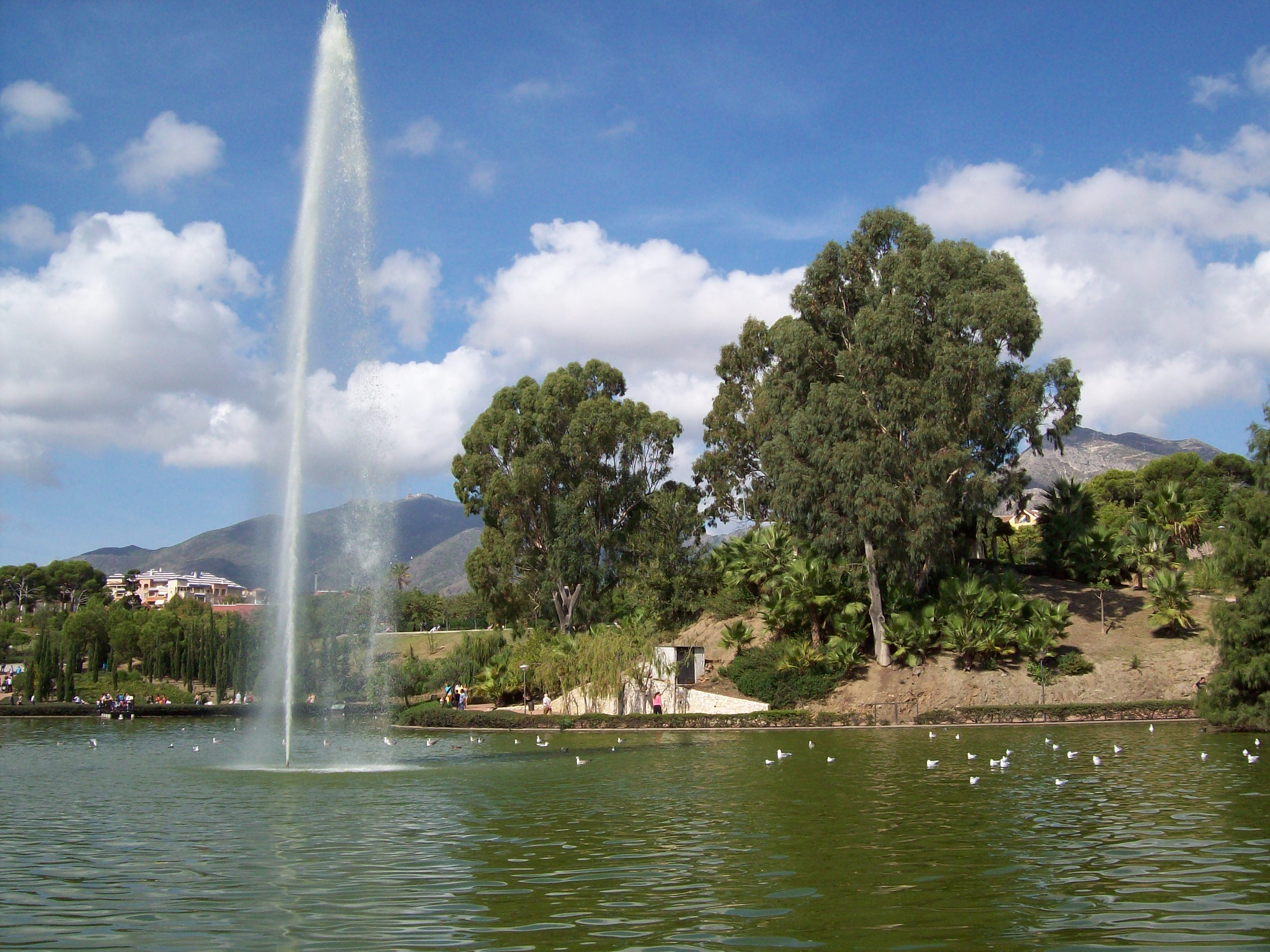
Gardens of La Paloma
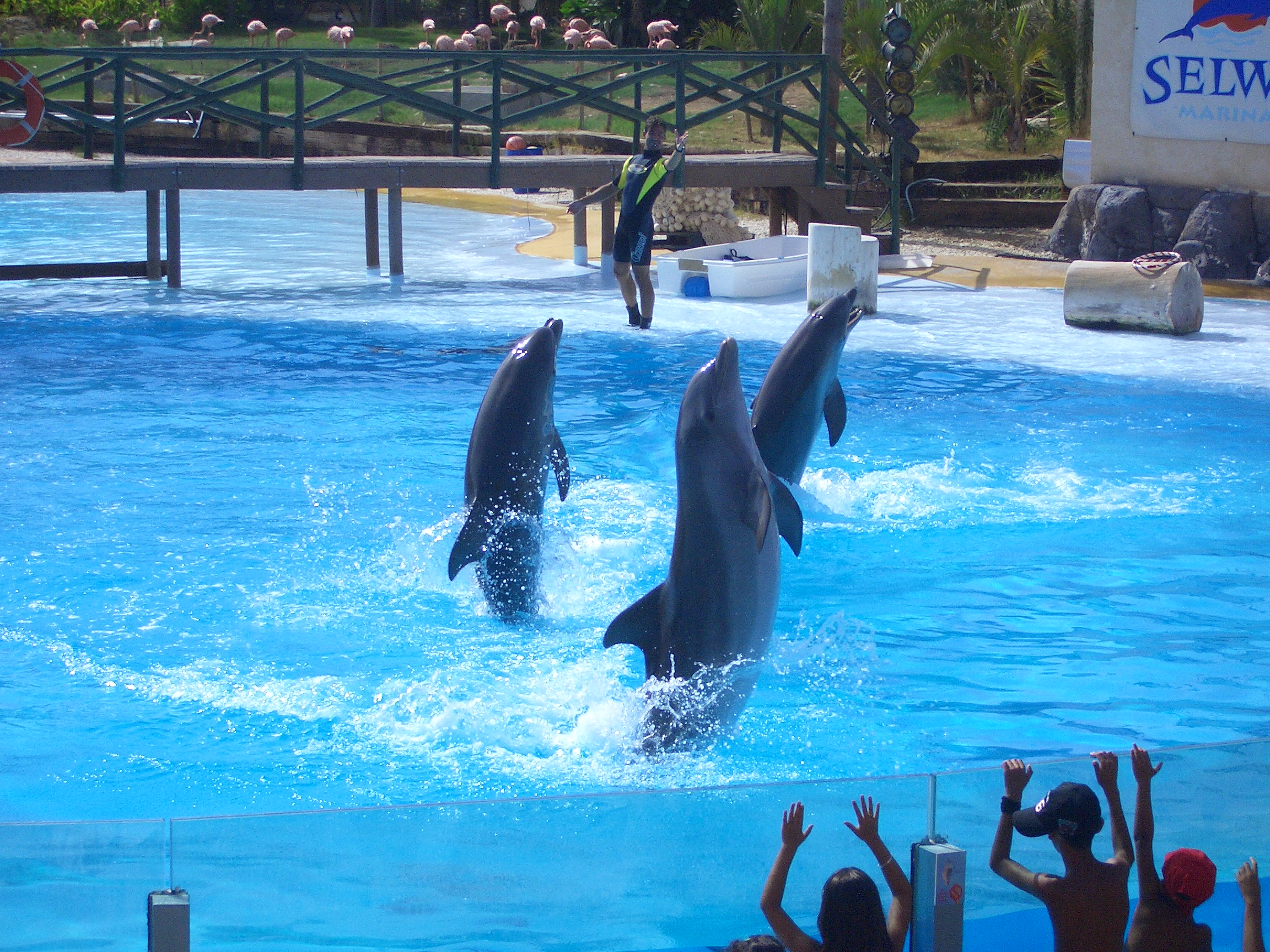
Dolphins in Selwo Marina

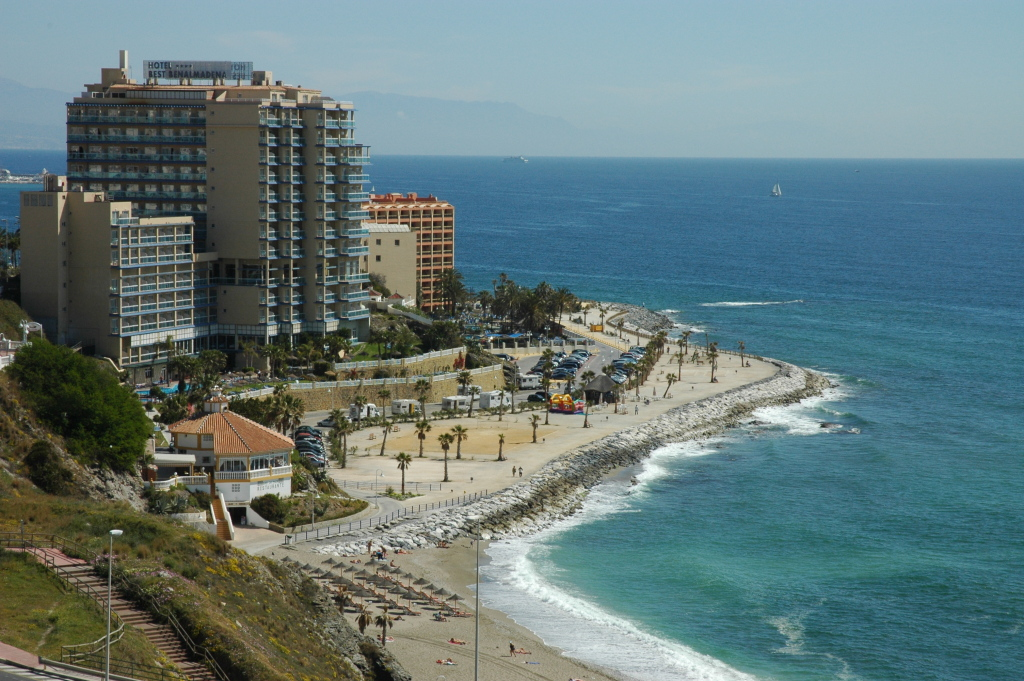
Part of the coast

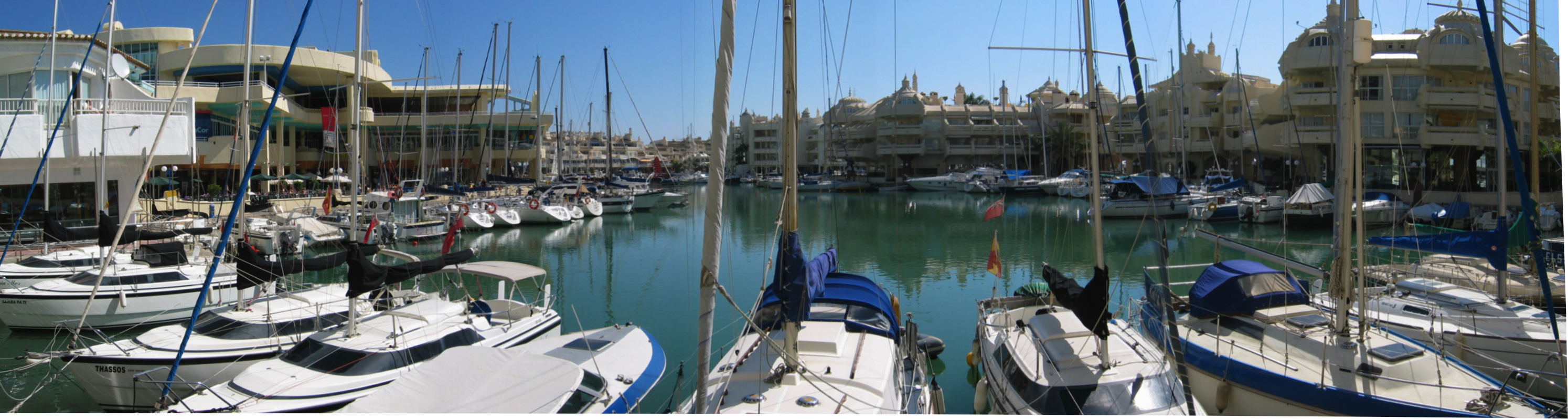
Puerto Marina.

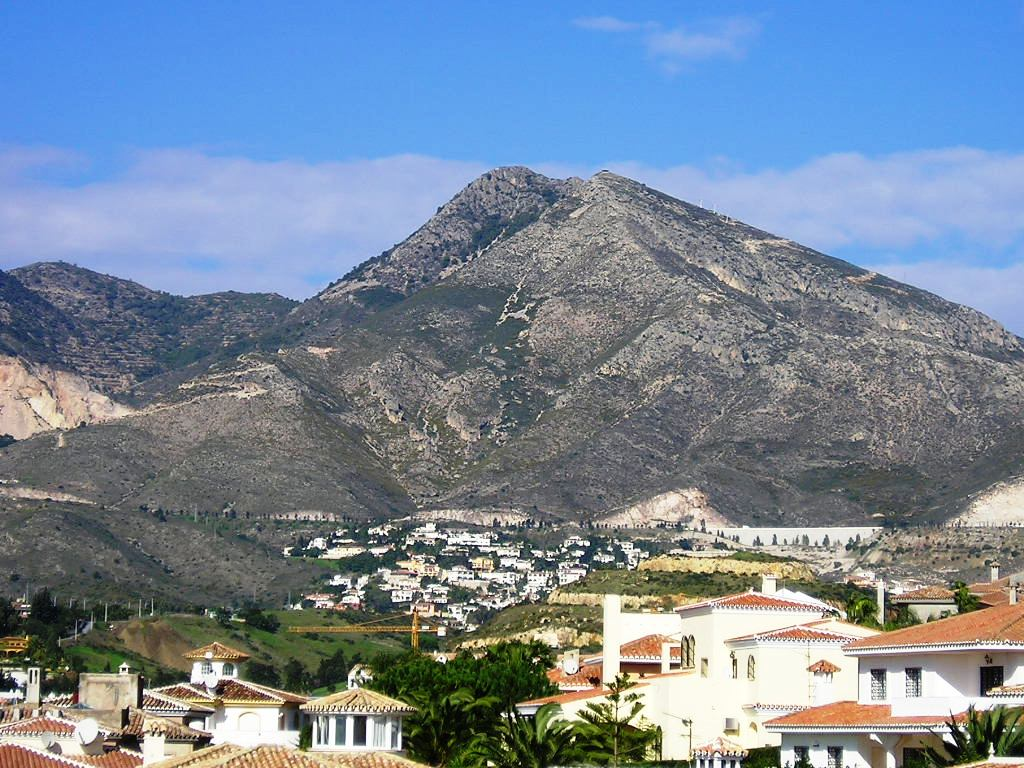
This mountain can be accessed by the Cable Car facility.

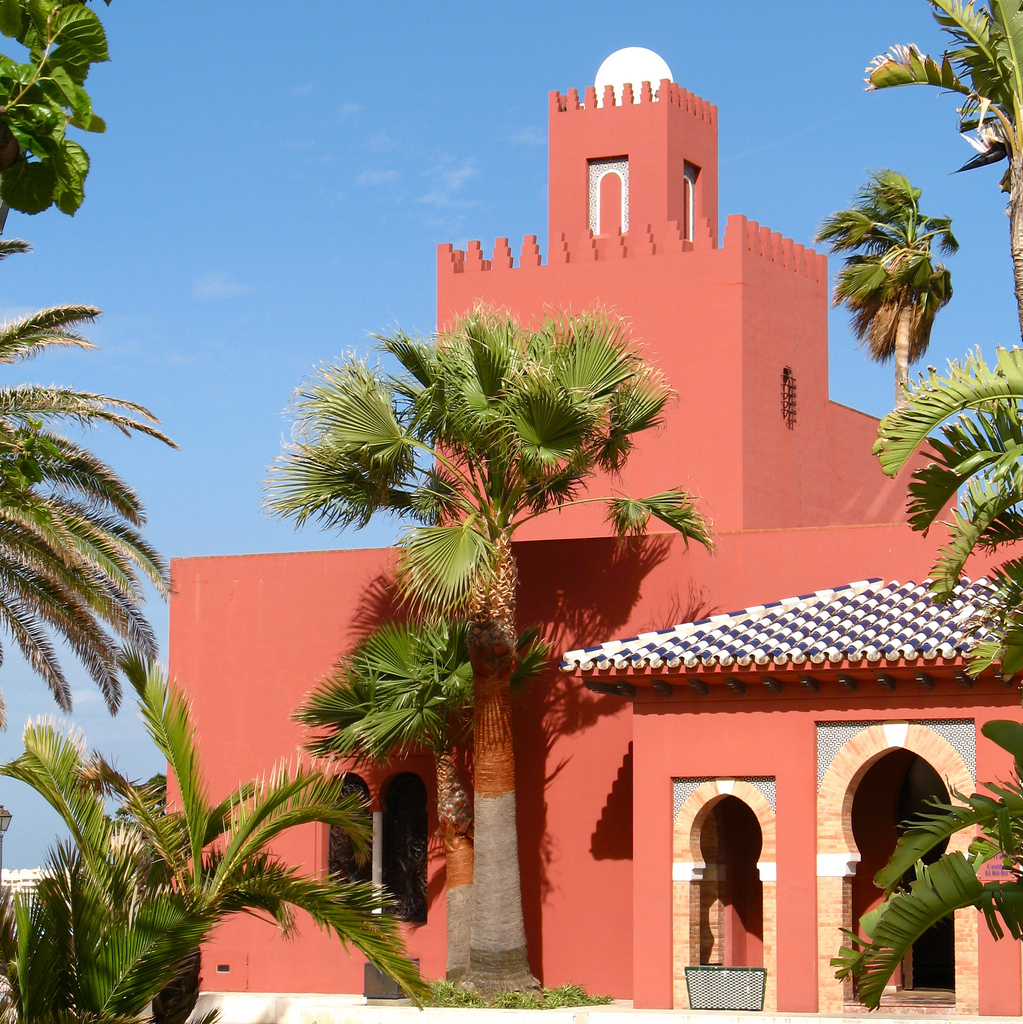
Bil-bil Castle

== Public transport ==
Benalmádena Council is integrated into the Málaga Metropolitan Transport Consortium. There is a single ticket for metropolitan and urban buses Cercanías Málaga and Metro de Málaga.

The town is on the C1 line of the Cercanías Málaga urban railway that runs from Málaga via Málaga-Costa del Sol Airport to Fuengirola, with trains every 20 minutes. The main station is Arroyo de la Miel and the secondary one is Torremuelle.

== Twin towns ==
- Finale Ligure, Italy
- Nuevitas, Cuba
- Beyoğlu, Turkey

== Notable people ==
Scientist

- Ibn al-Baytar

Artists

- Imperio Argentina

Politicians

- Celia Villalobos

Sportspeople

- Iván Aguilar
- José Antonio Crespo
- Isco
- Junior Firpo

== See also ==
- List of municipalities in Málaga
