= Parque de la Paloma =

Urban park in Benalmádena, Spain

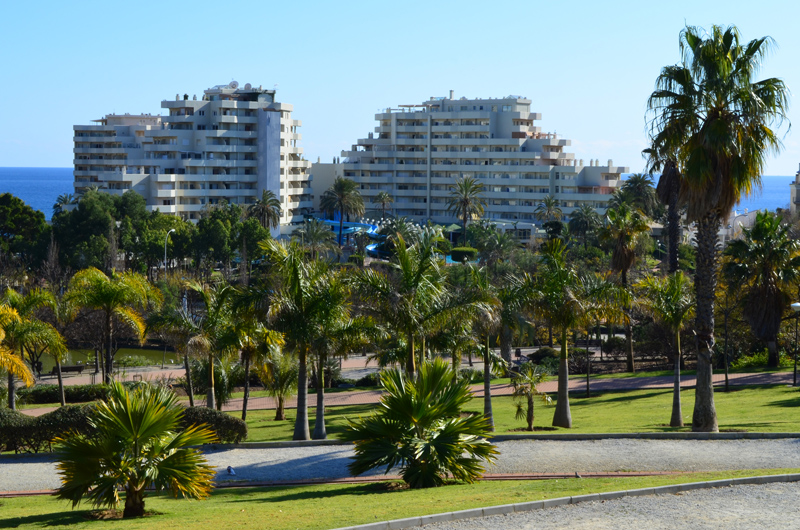
- Interactive map of Parque de la Paloma
- Type: Public park, recreational area
- Location: Benalmádena, Málaga, Spain
- Coordinates: 36°35′37.3″N 4°31′43.2″W
- Area: 5.7 acres (2.3 ha)
- Created: 1995
- Operator: Ayuntamiento de Benalmádena
- Status: Open year-round
- Public transit: Benalmádena train station (approx. 15-20 minute walk), local bus services
- Website: Parque de la Paloma information at Ayuntamiento de Benalmádena

El Parque de la Paloma, also known as "Dove Park", "Pigeon Park", or "Paloma Park", is a public urban park located in Benalmádena, in the province of Málaga, Spain. The park is known for its landscaped gardens, lake, and fauna, and is a popular attraction on the Costa del Sol.

== History ==
Parque de la Paloma was established in the late 20th century as part of an initiative by the local government to create recreational spaces in Benalmádena.

== Facilities ==
The park's amenities include landscaped gardens with flower beds and ornamental trees, a lake, wildlife areas, including animals like peacocks and rabbits, a cactus area with hundreds of plants, a children's playground, benches and grassy picnic areas, and walking paths.

=== Community and events ===
The park hosts events including outdoor concerts, cultural festivals, environmental workshops, and community sports activities. The park is also often used for educational programs on nature conservation.

== Location ==
Parque de la Paloma is centrally located in Benalmádena. Visitors are able to reach the park using local bus routes, via the Benalmádena train station or by car.

== See also ==
- Benalmádena
- Málaga
- Costa del Sol
