= Lopon Tsechu =

Bhutanese buddhist teacher (1918–2003)

Lopon Tsechu Rinpoche
- Born: 1918; Bhutan
- Died: 10 June 2003 (aged 84–85); Bangkok, Thailand

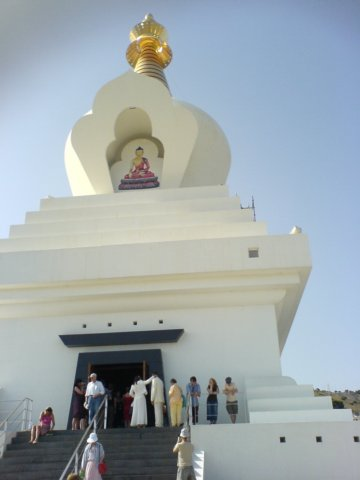
Stupa in Benalmádena, Spain – a project by Rinpoche

Lopon Tsechu Rinpoche (Dzongkha: སློབ་དཔོན་ཚེས་བཅུ་རིན་པོ་ཆེ་; 1918 in Bhutan – 10 June 2003 in Bangkok) was a master of Tibetan Buddhism, widely regarded in the Himalayas, with many students in both the East and the West.

== Overview ==
As a young boy, he was ordained as a monk in the largest monastery in Bhutan, Punakha Dzong. When he was 13 years old, he left Bhutan to study and practice under the spiritual guidance of his uncle Lama Sherab Dorje in Nepal. He trained with important teachers from all of the main Tibetan Buddhist schools, especially the Drukpa Kagyu and Karma Kagyu lineages. After meeting the 16th Gyalwa Karmapa in Bhutan in 1944, Lopon Tsechu Rinpoche became his close student and received from him the most essential teachings of the Karma Kagyu lineage. Karmapa expressed following about Rinpoche: "If I am Buddha, then he is Ananda". Ananda was the main student of Buddha. Besides from the transmissions received by Karmapa, Rinpoche received high transmissions from various great masters within the other 3 lineages (Gelug, Sakya, Nyingma) of Tibetan Buddhism.

== Activity ==
From his base in Kathmandu, Nepal Lopon Tsechu was a key figure in nurturing the development of Buddhism in Nepal following the occupation of Tibet by China. He exerted a formidable influence throughout the diverse Buddhist community in Nepal and was respected both as a great lama and also a skilled politician. In the 1980s the Nepalese king, and government appointed Rinpoche as responsible for the Buddhist activity in Nepal. Thereby Rinpoche sought to share the government donations between 2,000 monasteries in Nepal. Further Rinpoche used much time and energy to help the existing monasteries and giving advice on new projects. Rinpoche had this position for more than 20 years. Lopon Tsechu Rinpoche first came to the West in 1988 to give teachings and transmissions to many students. Over the next fifteen years Lopon Tsechu ministered to thousands of people in Europe, Russia and America.

In 1997, he established the Buddha Dharma Centre, a monastery near the Swayambhunath in Kathmandu.

Lopon Tsechu built many stupas, monuments symbolising the Enlightened mind of the Buddha, in both the East and the West. The crown jewel of his career, and one of his greatest legacies, is Benalmádena Stupa, located in Benalmádena, Spain. Inaugurated in 2003, it stands at 33 metres (or 108 feet) tall, making it the largest stupa in the Western world.

Lopon Tsechu became the first teacher of Ole Nydahl, the founder and leader of Diamond Way Buddhism in the West.

Lopon Tsechu Rinpoche died on 10 June 2003.
