= Dag Shang Kagyü =

Buddhist temple in Panillo, Huesca, Spain

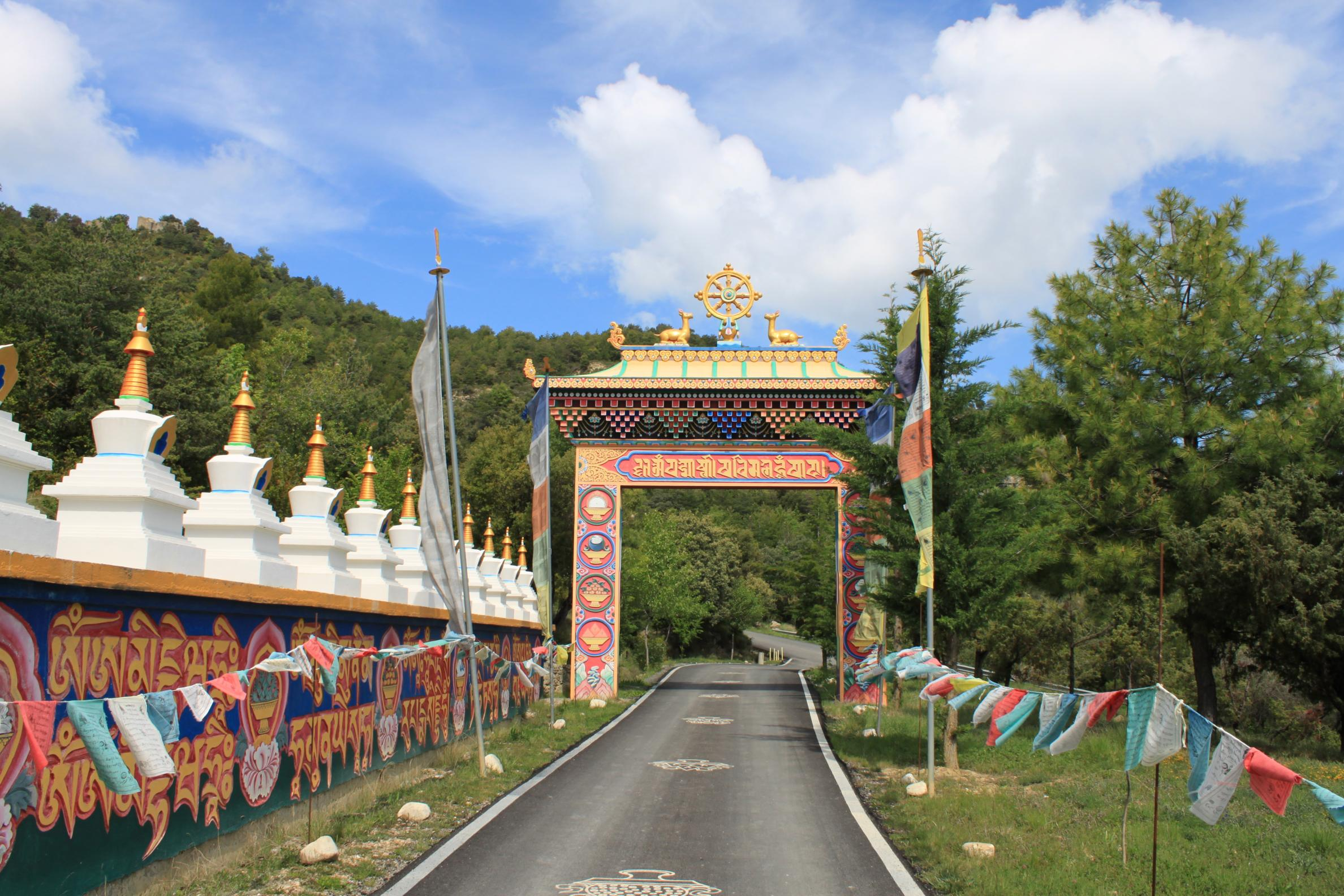
Main door of the temple.

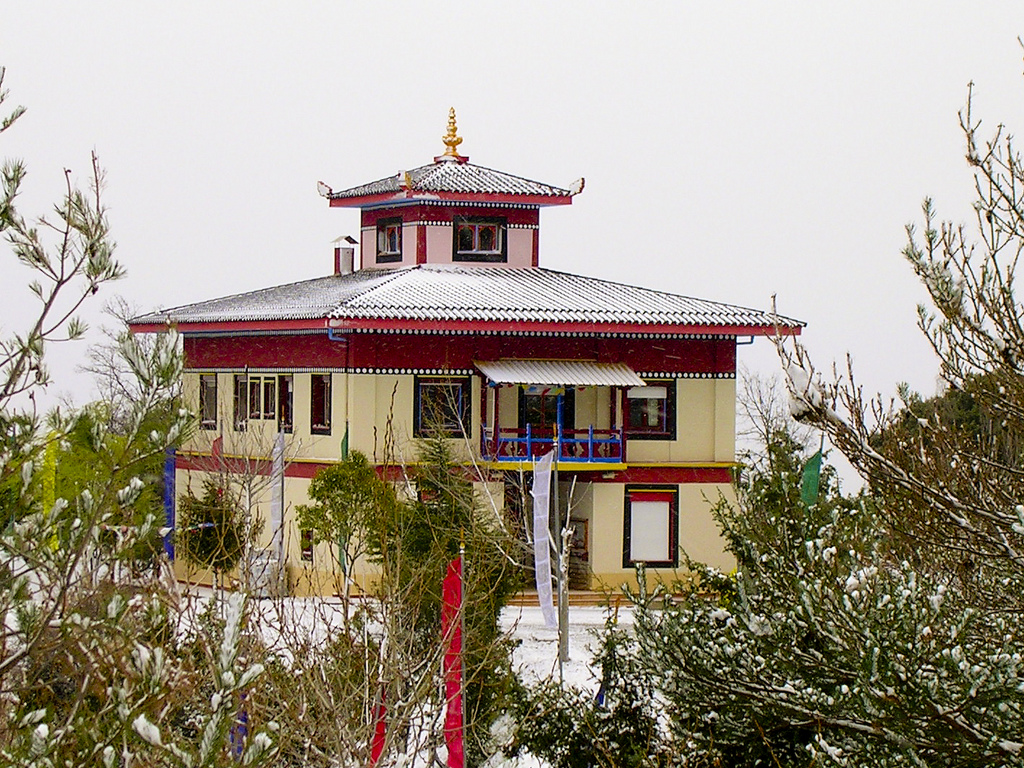
Partial view of the temple

Dag Shang Kagyü is a Buddhist temple located in Panillo, Huesca, Spain.

In 1984 H.Em Kalu Rinpoche established the monastery which, since 1985, is also a study centre of Buddhism practices. The lands of the monastery were sold in 1984 and then the monastery was extended with more lands donated by disciples of H.Em Kalu Rinpoche.

The temple has a traditional Bhutanese style with a 17 meters stupa and a translation school teaching literature, Philosophy and Tibetan language. It also has some spaces for people who retire to the monastery for months or years.

The director of the temple is the lama Drubgyu Tenpa. There are eight more lamas living there, five Buthanese and the rest Europeans.

Dag Shang Kagyu is part of the Rimé movement, or non-sectarian, which respects all traditions and recognizes as valid all paths to obtain supreme spiritual realization.
