= Benalmádena Stupa =

Stupa in Málaga, Spain

Coordinates: 36.5883°N 4.5808°W

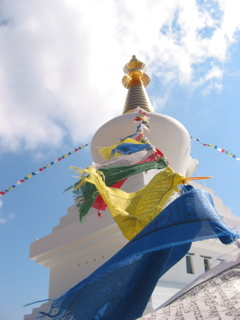
Benalmádena Stupa, 2003

Benalmádena Stupa is a stupa in Benalmádena, Málaga in the Andalusian region of southern Spain, overlooking Costa del Sol. It is 33 m (108 ft) high and is the tallest stupa in Europe. It was inaugurated on 5 October 2003, and was the final project of Lopon Tsechu Rinpoche.

== Overview ==
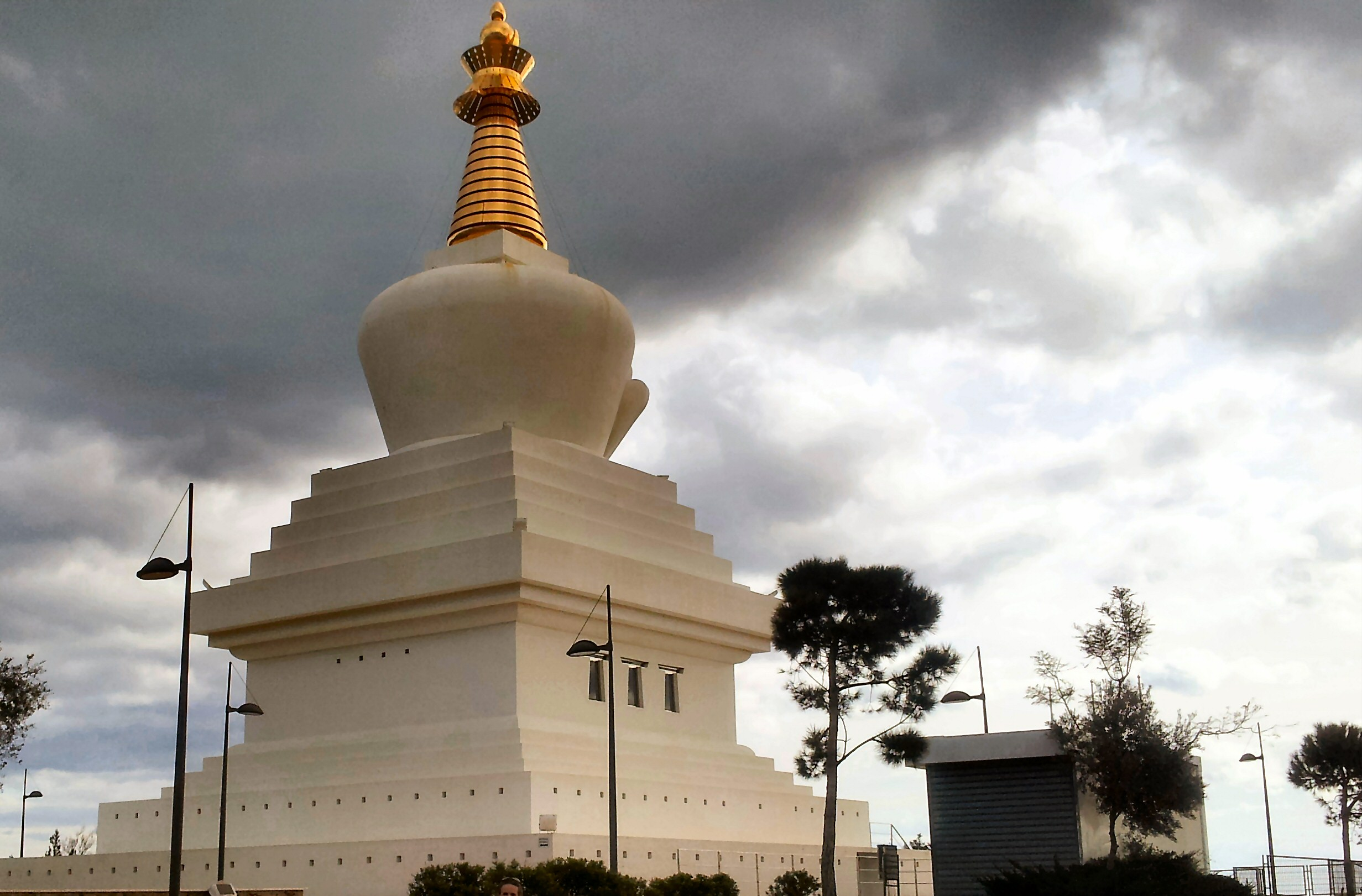
Benalmádena Stupa, 2013

In Buddhism, a stupa is a monument which represents peace, prosperity and harmony, as well as being a place for meditation. Benalmádena Stupa (Chan Chub Chorten in Tibetan) symbolizes Buddha's enlightenment, the realisation of the nature of the mind, and is one of the eight different forms that stupas are built. Whereas stupas are typically sealed structures, the Benalmádena Stupa is unusual as there is a 100 square metre meditation room and a room that can be used for exhibitions about Tibetan Buddhism and Himalayan culture inside the structure. The walls of the meditation room are painted with the life story of the historical Buddha Sakyamuni.

Bhutanese Lama Lopon Tsechu guided the ritual elements, while German-based Polish architect Woitek Kossowski, oversaw construction. The stupa was inaugurated on 5 October 2003 by H.H. Kunzig Shamar Rinpoche, the second-most important teacher within the Karma Kagyu lineage of Tibetan Buddhism. Also present was Lömpo Sangye Ngodup, a minister from the Himalayan Kingdom of Bhutan, Lama Ole Nydahl and the Mayor of Benalmádena, Enrique Bolin. Sr Bolin was inspired by another large Karma Kagyu Diamond Way stupa near Vélez-Málaga, Spain, and was instrumental in providing the land on which the stupa is situated. The stupa is run by the non-profit Asociación Cultural Karma Kagyu de Benalmádena, under the spiritual guidance of the 17th Karmapa Trinley Thaye Dorje.

== Lopon Tsechu Rinpoche ==
Lopon Tsechu visited Spain for the first time in 1990, where he gave teachings and empowerments at Karma Guen, a Buddhist meditation centre near Vélez-Málaga, about 50 km (31 miles) from Benalmádena. Rinpoche built his first stupa at Karma Guen in 1994, a symbol of peace and prosperity for Spain. Rinpoche went on to build 16 more stupas in Europe before his death in 2003. Rinpoche became a resident of Spain in 1995 and began visiting the country regularly, giving further teachings and empowerments. Tsechu Rinpoche guided this stupa project from the beginning but died near its completion. The final inauguration was performed by the 14th Shamar Rinpoche.
