= Buddhism in Latin America =

Buddhism in Latin America and the Caribbean

Buddhism in Latin America is a minority religion present in virtually every country of the region, the result of two distinct historical processes: Asian immigration of the nineteenth and twentieth centuries, which transplanted Buddhist institutions of an ethnic character, and the conversion of people without Asian ancestry, mostly from the second half of the twentieth century.

An inventory of centres and temples published in 2025 by Frank Usarski, Rafael Shoji and Catón Carini counted close to 985 active Buddhist institutions in the region, with the presence of practically all schools, from the oldest traditions to neo-Buddhist movements. Mahayana gathers around 60 per cent of them, Vajrayana about 32 per cent, and Theravada barely 4 per cent.

The academic field devoted to the topic is still small and has concentrated on Brazil and Argentina, so the authors of the survey studies have repeatedly pointed out the lack of region-wide research.

== History ==
=== Early Asian migratory waves ===
The first significant Asian immigration to Latin America brought Chinese workers to several countries of the region. A small group arrived in Brazil in 1810 without leaving public Buddhist traces, and something similar occurred in Peru, a destination of Chinese immigration since 1848 that by 1874 counted some 100,000 Chinese. The tendency toward mixed marriages and rapid acculturation meant that this migration left no institutional Buddhist legacy, a process repeated in other countries such as Venezuela.

It was Japanese immigration, more durable and extensive, that had the greatest impact on the region's institutionalized Buddhism. Among the first Japanese immigrants there were religious representatives: in 1903 the monks Ueno and Masumoto, of the Soto Zen school, and the Reverend Kinoshita, of the Jodo school, arrived in Peru.

=== Institutionalization in Brazil ===
The Reverend Tomojiro Ibaraki, of the Honmon Butsuryu-shu school, arrived in Brazil in 1908 aboard the Kasato Maru, the ship that inaugurated Japanese immigration to the country and docked at Santos on 18 June of that year. In 1936 he founded the Taissenji temple in Guaiçara, the first official Buddhist institution of Brazil, moved to Lins in 1951.

Shortly afterwards the first entity of Shin Buddhism was inaugurated in Cafelândia and the Honpa Honganji and Shingon schools were introduced. Between 1940 and 1941 two more Honmon Butsuryu-shu temples were built.

=== Postwar consolidation ===
The decision of most Japanese immigrants to remain in Brazil after the Second World War produced a wave of institutionalization. Honmon Butsuryu-shu opened three new centres between 1949 and 1950 and inaugurated its headquarters in São Paulo in 1962. At the beginning of the 1950s the Tendai school and the Ōtani branch of Jodo Shinshu opened their first temples, while the Honpa branch established its national headquarters in São Paulo and the Soto Zen and Nichirenshu schools officially announced their missions in the country. In 1958 the Federation of Buddhist Sects was founded in Brazil, an umbrella entity of the Japanese organizations operating in Brazilian territory.

Much of the institutions founded in this period remained rooted exclusively in the religious life of families of Japanese descent, a tendency observable in most of the more than eighty branches of Shin Buddhism in the region and in traditional Zen temples such as the Busshinji of São Paulo or the Daishinji of Bogotá.

=== Late Korean and Chinese immigration ===
The later Chinese migratory waves did leave an institutional mark. The process that developed between 1949 and the end of the 1980s, which brought some 100,000 Chinese to Brazil, gave rise to the country's first Chinese Buddhist institution, the Mo Ti temple of São Paulo, founded in 1962, and later to the Kuang Ying temple, in 1987 in the same city.

Korean immigration also contributed. Mexico was a temporary destination of Korean migration as early as 1903, although without manifest religious consequences, and the flow toward Central and South America resumed and intensified from the 1960s. In 1984 the Chogye school inaugurated the Jin Gak temple in São Paulo, which absorbed part of the membership of the Kwan Um school, established in Brazil the previous year. Subsequently Seon Buddhism took root in Argentina, where between 1991 and 1992 it established local centres, including a branch in Buenos Aires.

=== Diffusion among the non-Asian population ===
Alongside migrant-based Buddhism a convert Buddhism developed, of people without Asian ancestry who left their religion of origin, generally Catholicism. In countries with little significant Asian immigration, such as Colombia and Chile, institutional Buddhism rests almost exclusively on this second group.

In the diffusion of Zen among practitioners without Asian roots, figures such as Shingū Ryohan, superintendent of the Busshinji temple between 1956 and 1985, as well as Tokuda Ryotan, Shunkyo Aoki and Daiko Moriyama, were decisive. The intellectual reception of Buddhism in the Spanish-speaking world was also mediated by the publication in Mexico of Budismo zen y psicoanálisis, by D. T. Suzuki, Erich Fromm and Richard De Martino, by the Fondo de Cultura Económica in 1964.

In the case of Tibetan Buddhism, the teacher-disciple relationship made the presence of lamas a decisive element. The master of the Nyingma line Chagdud Tulku moved the headquarters of his international movement from the United States to Brazil and established a transnational network of centres that includes institutions in Argentina, Chile and Uruguay; in Chile, the lama Tounsang was already initiating practitioners in 1981. The seven visits of the Dalai Lama to Latin America between 1988 and 2013 promoted Buddhism in general and Vajrayana in particular.

The Theravada tradition has also spread among converts without Asian ancestry, although on a much smaller scale: unlike Mahayana and Vajrayana, its establishment in the region has depended almost entirely on conversion and not on migrant communities. Its institutional presence is organized around a small network of monasteries and teachers of the Burmese and Thai traditions. The Argentine-born monk Bhikkhu Nandisena founded in 1999 the Dhamma Vihāra in Jilotepec, Veracruz, Mexico, the first Theravada monastery of the Spanish-speaking world, and has translated into Spanish the Abhidhammattha Saṅgaha (1999) and the Dhammapada with Buddhaghosa's commentary (2008). The Mexican monk Bhante Rāhula, a disciple of Sayadaw U Tejaniya of the Burmese Mahasi lineage, founded the Paññābhūmi Monastery in Zapopan, Mexico, and has taught in Uruguay, Colombia, Peru, Argentina, Chile and Brazil. In Brazil, the monk Ajahn Mudito founded in 2017 the Mosteiro Suddhavāri, the only Brazilian monastery of the Thai forest tradition. The Vipassana meditation tradition of Ajahn Tong Sirimangalo spread among Spanish-speaking converts through the Casa de Meditación Vipassana in Mexico, founded by Khun Chakkaratani, and the Anumodana community led by Miguel Pelusi, with retreats in Mexico, Spain, Colombia and Argentina.

== Schools ==
=== Mahayana ===
Mahayana is the institutionally most widespread current, with some 565 organizations, close to 60 per cent of the regional total. Institutions of Japanese origin predominate (about 515), followed by those of Chinese origin (about 28), Korean (thirteen) and Vietnamese (ten).

The numerically most relevant school of the whole region is the Soka Gakkai, with approximately 240 local centres, around 25 per cent of all Buddhist institutions of Latin America. Zen occupies the second place within Mahayana with some 158 centres, and Shin Buddhism the third with about 86 institutions.

=== Vajrayana ===
Tibetan-origin Vajrayana Buddhism counts some 354 temples and centres, around 32 per cent of the Buddhist institutions established in the region. The Kagyu school predominates, with some 118 groups, followed by the Nyingma with about 89 practice sites. The New Kadampa Tradition has established approximately 55 centres, and the Gelug school is represented by about 44. Eleven centres belong to the Sakya school, eight to the Bon tradition and 29 local groups are classified as non-sectarian.

=== Theravada ===
Theravada is the institutionally least significant current of the region, with some 38 local centres, barely 4 per cent of the total. Unlike Mahayana and Vajrayana, its establishment has depended almost entirely on conversion and not on migrant communities.

The only predominantly ethnic Theravada institution of Latin America is the Wat Lao Rattanarangsiyaram temple, in Posadas, Misiones Province, Argentina. Its origin dates to 1979, when around two hundred Laotian families received asylum in Argentina and settled in Misiones because of the resemblance between the Misiones jungle and that of Laos. The community lacked a temple and monks for years, a situation that was reversed with the opening of the site in 1997. On 21 February 2020 the largest statue of the Buddha in Latin America was inaugurated on its grounds, thirteen metres high by ten wide, built by the community itself over eight years and financed with its own donations and those of devotees from other countries.

Among the antecedents of Theravada teaching in the region is the presence of the Sinhalese monk Puhuwelle Nayaka Vipassi, a specialist in vipassana meditation, at the Sociedade Budista do Brasil of Rio de Janeiro between 1986 and 2006.

The first Theravada monastery of the Spanish-speaking world was Dhamma Vihāra, founded in 1999 in Jilotepec, Veracruz, Mexico, by the Argentine-born monk Bhikkhu Nandisena, also translator into Spanish of the Abhidhammattha Saṅgaha of Anuruddha and of the Dhammapada.

In Brazil, the Brazilian monk Ajahn Mudito founded in 2017 the Mosteiro Suddhavāri, in Soledade de Minas (Minas Gerais), the only Brazilian monastery of the Thai Forest Tradition.

Another avenue of establishment has been the vipassanā meditation lineage of Wat Phra That Si Chom Thong, in northern Thailand, founded by Ajahn Tong Sirimangalo: groups that practise in this tradition operate in Mexico, Colombia and Argentina.

The tradition reached Mexico through Virginia Gurza Ayón, known as Khun Chakkaratani (1954–2022), who met Ajahn Tong in Thailand in 1984 and organized his first visit to the country, during which he led the first Vipassana retreats in Mexico in 1985; she founded the Casa de Meditación Vipassana and taught for over thirty years as his representative. Miguel Pelusi, born in Mexico City, is the director of Anumodana, the Spanish-speaking branch of the tradition, and leads retreats in Mexico, Spain, Colombia and Argentina; in 1999 he received the title of lay instructor at Wat Phra That Si Chom Thong. The Spanish Vipassana centre Casa Betania, where Pelusi leads retreats, states that he received recognition from the queen and the government of Thailand for spreading Buddhism in the West.

In the Caribbean, the Theravada presence is more recent. In Cuba, where Buddhist practitioners represent a minimal fraction of the population, the tradition was sustained for years by visits of the monk Bhikkhu Mihita, of the Toronto Mahavihara, who gave lectures at the University of Havana and guided meditation workshops in several provinces.

In February 2026 the first Theravada vihara of Cuba opened in Havana, run by the bhikkhuni Mārajinā, of Cuban-American origin, ordained in May 2012 at the Aranya Bodhi hermitage in California with Tathālokā Bhikkhunī as preceptor. Much of the activity of this community is sustained through online transmissions in Spanish, a modality consolidated during the COVID-19 pandemic that has allowed the dispersed and small Theravada Spanish-speaking groups to share teachings at a distance.

== Geographic distribution ==
Latin American Buddhism is distributed very unevenly. Brazil concentrates around 40 per cent of the organizations of the region.

Buddhist institutions by country
Country	Institutions
Brazil	392
Mexico	139
Chile	87
Argentina	84
Colombia	48
Venezuela	37
Peru	35
Uruguay	24
Bolivia	22
Costa Rica	22
Cuba	17
Ecuador	15
Guatemala	14
Dominican Republic	10
El Salvador	10
Puerto Rico	10
Paraguay	9
Nicaragua	5
Panama	4
Honduras	1

== Demographics ==
Establishing the number of Buddhists in the region is problematic. National censuses do not always record the category, and the figures disseminated by Buddhist organizations themselves tend to include occasional sympathizers alongside declared adherents, which introduces methodological doubts. For that reason the survey studies have chosen to measure the presence of Buddhism through its institutions rather than by the number of practitioners.

Brazil, which has the longest series, recorded 236,408 Buddhists in the 1991 census, 214,873 in 2000 and 243,966 in 2010, around 0.13 per cent of the population. Frank Usarski has pointed out that this aggregate growth conceals two opposite dynamics: the aging and decline of the so-called "ethnic" Buddhism, tied to families of Japanese descent, against the rise of convert Buddhism.

Other countries do not even allow that calculation. The Mexican census of 2020 does not break down Buddhists, who are included within the "other religions" category, with 40,391 people in the whole country.

== See also ==
- Buddhism in Chile
- Theravada
- Mahayana
- Tibetan Buddhism
- Religion in Latin America

== Bibliography ==
- Carini, Catón (2018). "Southern dharma: outlines of Buddhism in Argentina". International Journal of Latin American Religions. 2 (1): 3–21. doi:10.1007/s41603-018-0039-4. hdl:11336/136019.
- Garrard-Burnett, Virginia; Freston, Paul; Dove, Stephen C. (2016). The Cambridge History of Religions in Latin America. Cambridge: Cambridge University Press.
- May May, Enrique Rodrigo (2019). "Budistas en México. Una aproximación desde las estadísticas censales". Debates do NER (in Spanish). 1 (35): 237–270. doi:10.22456/1982-8136.95732.
- Mesa Sánchez, Daniel (2022). "El budismo zen en Colombia: una etnografía de la meditación zazen y la construcción del espacio sagrado". Kula. Revista de Antropología y Ciencias Sociales (in Spanish) (26): 60–74.
- Ríos, María Elvira (2022). "Foguangshan en Chile: encuentro, adaptación e interacción cultural". Aisthesis (in Spanish). 11 (71): 11–24. doi:10.7764/Aisth.71.1.
- Usarski, Frank (2002). O Budismo no Brasil (in Portuguese). São Paulo: Lorosae.
- Usarski, Frank; Shoji, Rafael (2022). "Buddhism in Latin America. From ethnic religion to alternative spirituality". In Pablo A. Baisotti (ed.). Social, Political, and Religious Movements in the Modern Americas. New York: Routledge. pp. 359–381.
- Vallverdú, Jaume; Millet, Guillermo D. (2023–2024). Estudios budistas en América Latina y España (in Spanish). Vol. I–II. Tarragona: Publicacions URV / Fundación Dharma-Gaia.
