= Religion in South America =

Religion in South America has been a major influence on art, culture, philosophy and law and changed greatly in recent years. Roman Catholicism has rapidly declined. Most of this is due to the growth of Protestantism, particularly evangelical Christians. A smaller number of South Americans are also beginning to identify as irreligious. Sizeable adherents of other religions are also present, including of various indigenous religions.

== Religious freedom ==
Currently, all countries in the region in general are separate of the Catholic Church and declared secular states, which guarantees freedom of religion for its inhabitants. However, in Peru, Roman Catholicism serves as the official religion. In that country Catholic religious education is mandatory, and in most of the region's nations Roman Catholicism still sways the population.

== Christianity ==
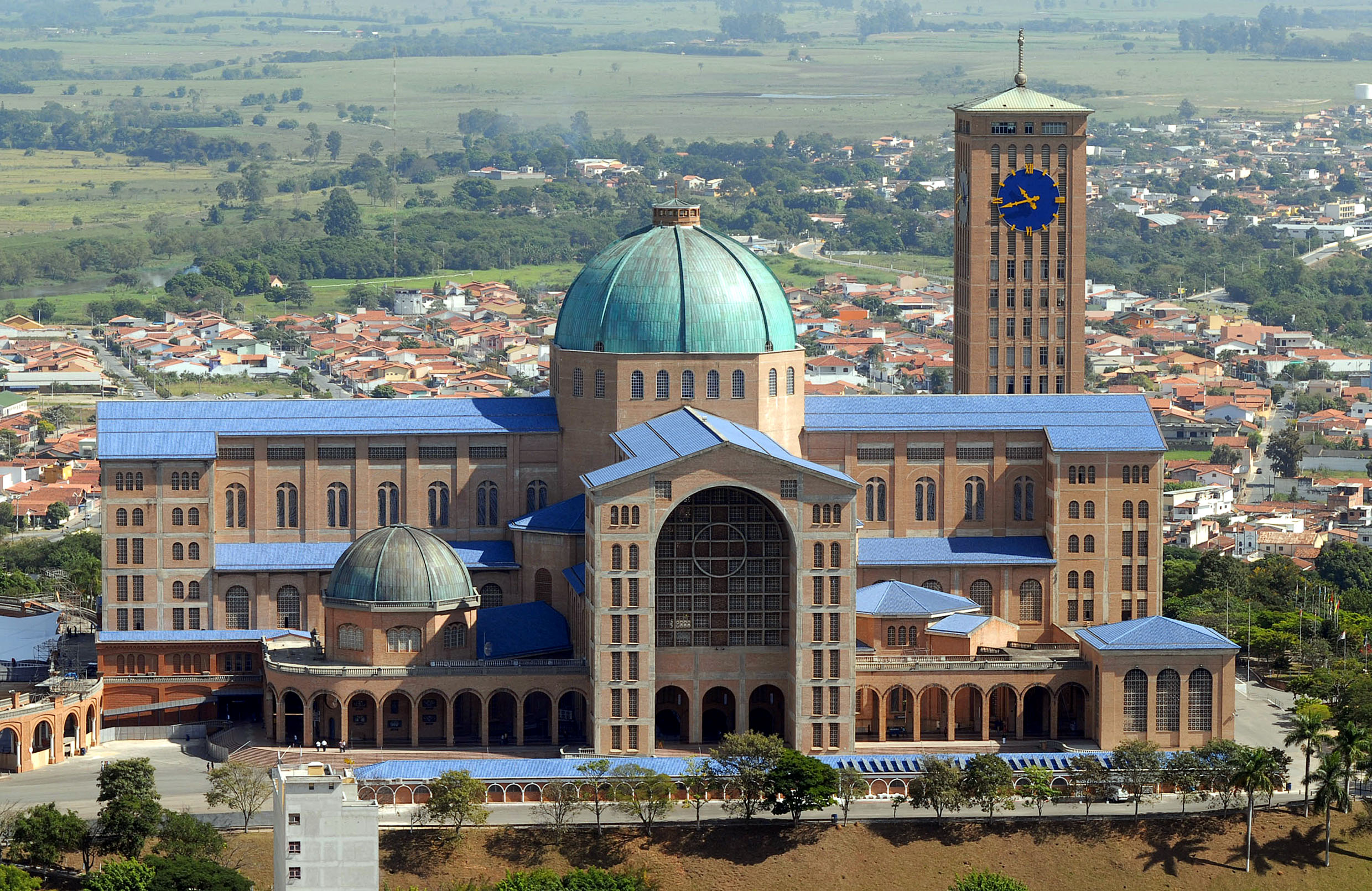
The Basilica of the National Shrine of Our Lady of Aparecida in Brazil is the second largest in the world, after only of the Basilica of Saint Peter in Vatican City.

Christianity is the largest religion in South America. According to a Pew Research Center projection in 2010, they predicted that 83.4% of the South American population will be Christian in 2020.

=== Catholicism ===
Catholicism is the most professed Christian faith in many South American countries. In Paraguay, Peru, Colombia and Argentina more than three-quarters of the population is Catholic. Catholicism was the only religion allowed in the colonial era; the indigenous people were forced to abandon their beliefs, although many did not abandon it at all, for example, countries with predominantly Amerindian population such as Bolivia and Peru there is a syncretism between indigenous religions and the Catholic religion, that has occurred since colonial times. In Brazil or Colombia, Catholicism was mixed with certain African rituals.

=== Protestantism ===
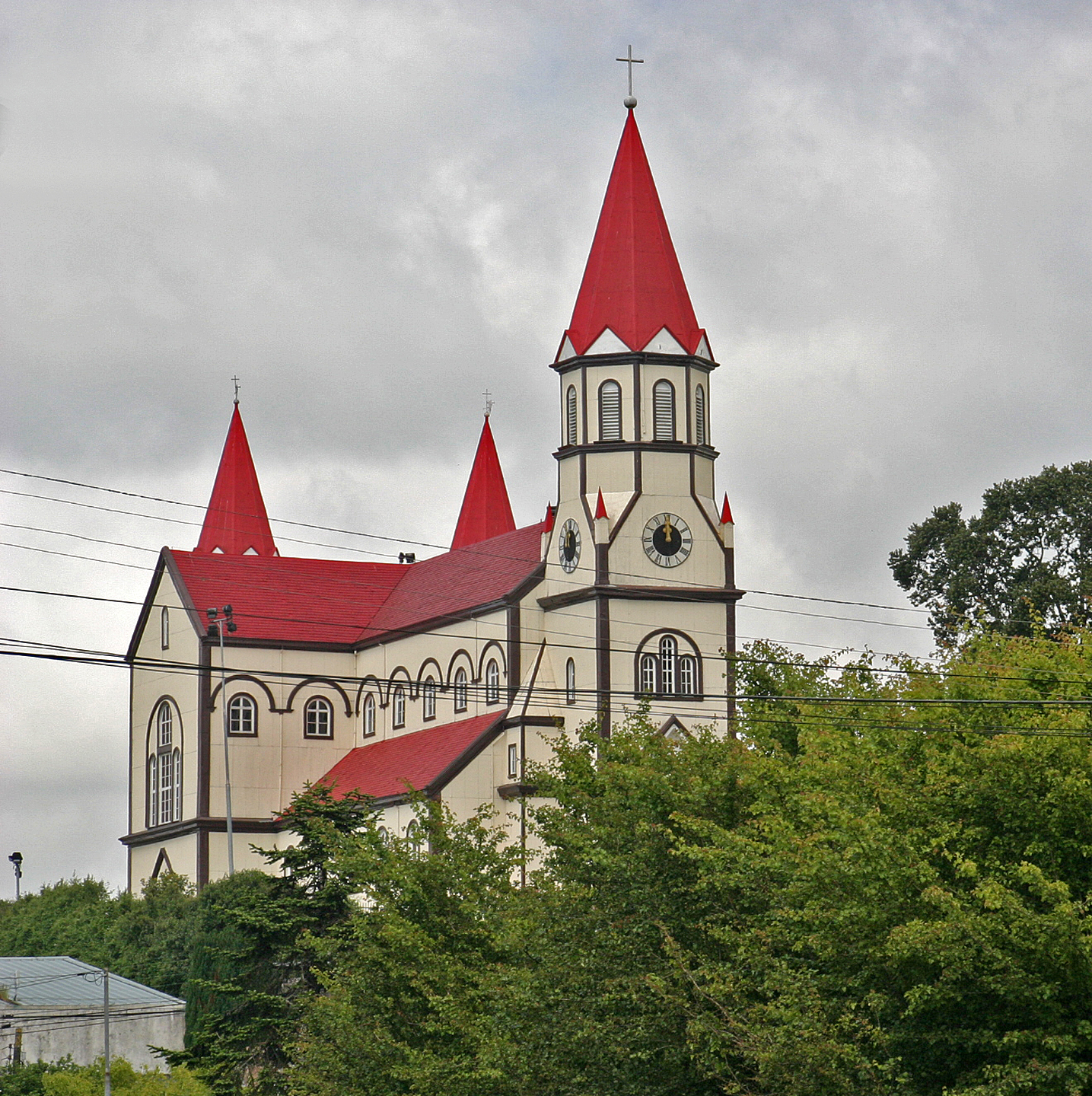
The Sacred Heart of Jesus Church of Puerto Varas in Chile

Protestantism has had a presence since the nineteenth century, as a minority, but witnessed a strong increase since the 1980s. The majority of Latin American Protestants in general are Pentecostal. Brazil today is the most Protestant country in South America with 22.2% of the population being Protestant, 89% of Brazilian evangelicals are Pentecostal, in Chile they represent 79% of the total evangelicals in that country, 69% in Argentina and 59% in Colombia. On the other part, in Uruguay 66% of evangelicals are Methodist, while only 20% are Pentecostal. There are up to an estimated two hundred million Pentecostals and Renewalists in Latin America. Approximately 160 million Latin Americans are Evangelical. Forty million South Americans are Christians independent from denominations.

=== Eastern Orthodoxy ===
Eastern Orthodoxy was brought to South America by groups of immigrants from several different regions, mainly Eastern Europe and the Middle East. This traditional branch of Eastern Christianity has also spread beyond the boundaries of immigrant communities. There are several Eastern Orthodox ecclesiastical jurisdictions in South America, organized within the Assembly of Canonical Orthodox Bishops of Latin America.

=== Oriental Orthodoxy ===
Oriental Orthodoxy was brought to South America by several groups of Christian immigrants, mainly from the Middle East, Caucasus, Africa and India. This ancient branch of Eastern Christianity includes several ecclesiastical jurisdictions in the South America, like Coptic Orthodox Church in South America and Syriac Orthodox Church.

=== Other Christians ===
Practitioners of the Church of Jesus Christ of Latter-day Saints and Jehovah's Witnesses religions also are present in South America.

== New religious movements ==
=== Spiritism ===
Brazil is the country with more practitioners in the world of Allan Kardec's codification of the Spiritism, followed by over 12 million people, with 30 to 45 million sympathizers. Most followers of the Spiritism are people that were mostly Catholic, Protestants and Atheists respectively.

Chico Xavier wrote over 490 books, which complements the spiritualist doctrine.

== Indigenous religions ==
Indigenous creeds and rituals are still practiced in some countries with large percentages of Amerindians, such as Bolivia and Peru.

== Hinduism ==
Hinduism is the second-largest religion in Suriname, Guyana and French Guiana. According to the 2015 census of Suriname, Hindus constitute 23.1% of the population. While according the 2020 census of Guyana, Hindus constitute 31% of the population. Guyana and Suriname also have the Third and Fourth largest population of Hindus in the Western Hemisphere respectively, after the United States and Canada.

== Buddhism ==
Buddhism is a minority religion in South America, practiced mainly by communities of Japanese descent as well as by converts. A 2025 survey by Frank Usarski, Rafael Shoji and Catón Carini counted some 985 active Buddhist institutions in Latin America and the Caribbean, of which roughly 60 per cent belong to the Mahayana school, about 32 per cent to the Vajrayana, and only about 4 per cent to the Theravada. Brazil concentrates about 40 per cent of the region's Buddhist organizations, followed by Argentina and Uruguay.

The Zen school, brought mainly by Japanese immigration, is the most established Buddhist tradition in South America, with centres such as the Busshinji temple in São Paulo and communities in Peru and Argentina. Tibetan Buddhism, of the Vajrayana school, has communities in Argentina, Chile, Colombia and Brazil. The Theravada tradition, the smallest of the three schools, is present through the Mosteiro Suddhavāri in Brazil, founded in 2017 by the Brazilian monk Ajahn Mudito, and the Wat Lao Rattanarangsiyaram temple in Posadas, Argentina, the only predominantly ethnic Theravada temple in Latin America. The Mexican monk Bhante Rāhula, a disciple of Sayadaw U Tejaniya, has also taught in several South American countries, including Uruguay, Colombia, Peru, Argentina, Chile and Brazil.

== Other religions ==
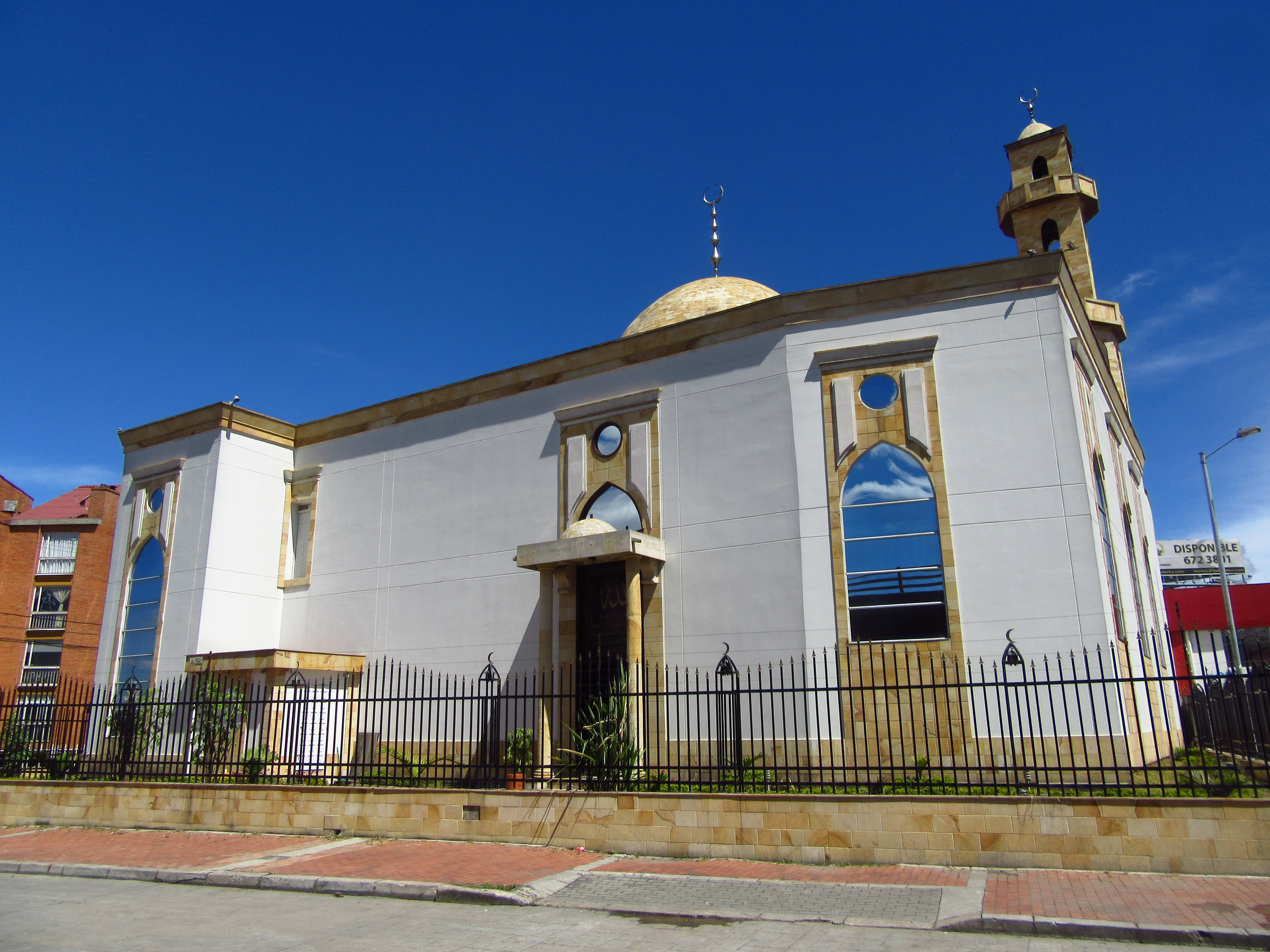
The Mosque of Abou Bakr Alsiddq in Bogotá.

Argentina has the largest communities of both Jews and Muslims in Latin America. Practitioners of Judaism, Islam, Buddhism, Hinduism, Bahá'í Faith, and other denominations and religions also exercised in Latin America.

== Statistics ==
Country By Religion in South America (2020 estimate):

Countries	Total Population	Christians %	Christians Population	Unaffiliated %	Unaffiliated Population	Other %	Other Population	Sources
Argentina	47,327,407	85.4%	37,420,000	12.1%	5,320,000	2.5%	2,000,000	
Bolivia	11,830,000	94%	11,120,000	4.1%	480,000	1.9%	230,000	
Brazil	210,450,000	88.1%	185,430,000	8.4%	17,620,000	3.5%	7,400,000	
Chile	18,540,000	88.3%	16,380,000	9.7%	1,800,000	2%	360,000	
Colombia	50,000,000	95.5%	47,750,000	4%	2,000,000	0.5%	250,000	
Ecuador	16,480,000	94%	15,490,000	5.6%	920,000	0.4%	70,000	
Guyana	850,000	67.9%	580,000	2%	20,000	30.1%	250,000	
Paraguay	7,630,000	96.9%	7,390,000	1.1%	90,000	2%	150,000	
Peru	32,920,000	95.4%	31,420,000	3.1%	1,010,000	1.5%	490,000	
Suriname	632,638	52.3%	300,000	6.2%	40,000	41.5%	240,000	
Uruguay	3,407,213	57%	1,990,000	41.5%	1,450,000	1.5%	50,000	
Venezuela	29,789,730	89.5%	29,540,000	9.7%	3,220,000	0.8%	250,000	
South America	422,194,269	83.43%	385,210,000	9.18%	35,480,000	7.39%	11,080,000	

== See also ==
- Major religious groups
- Religion in Africa
- Religion in Asia
- Religion in Europe
- Religion in Oceania
- Religion in North America
