= Ayya Sudhamma Bhikkhuni =

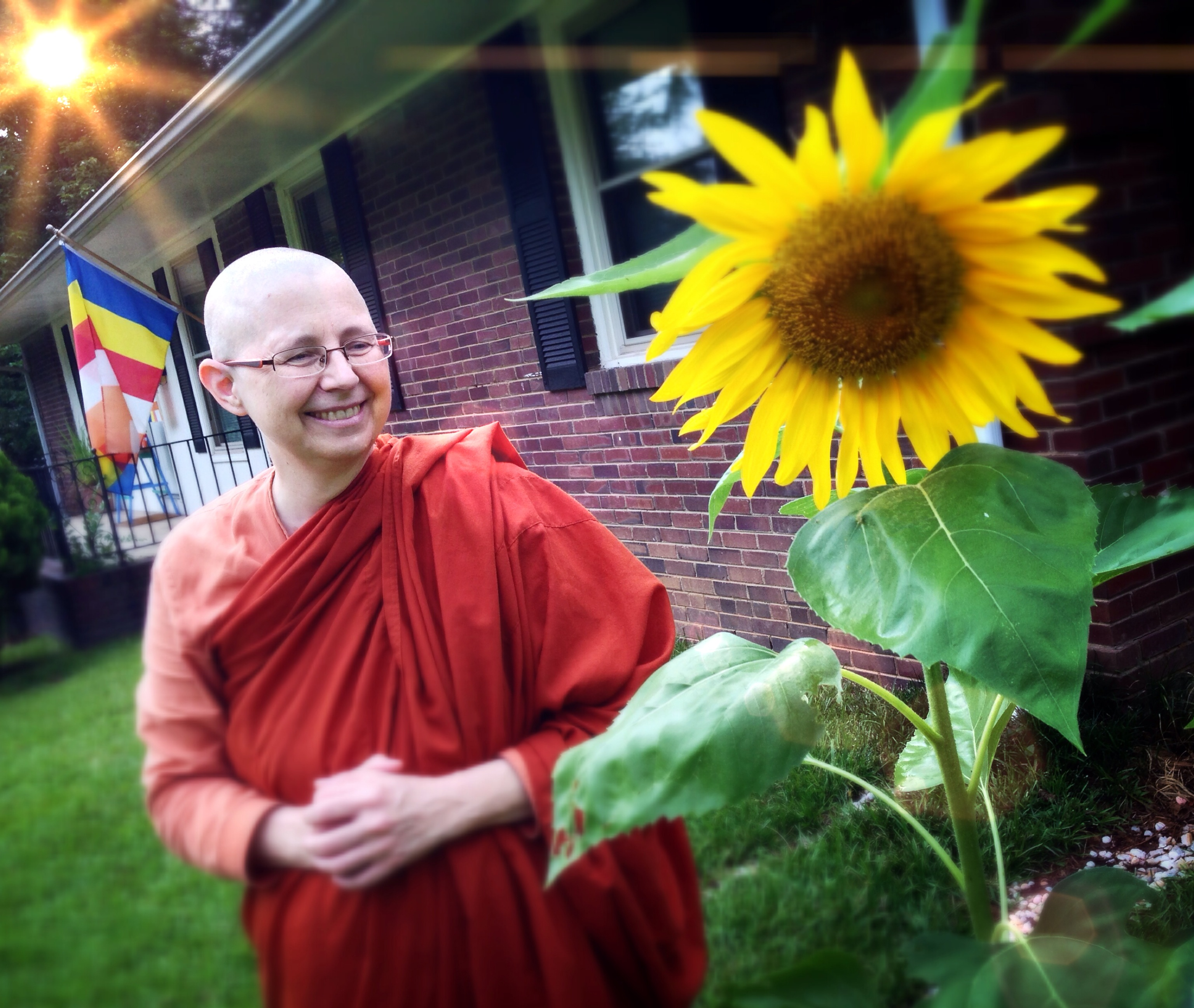
- Ayya Sudhamma

Personal life
- Born: 1963 (age 62–63) Charlotte, North Carolina, U.S.
- Education: New York University

Religious life
- Religion: Buddhism

Ayya Sudhamma Bhikkhuni (born in 1963 in Charlotte, North Carolina) is abbess of Charlotte Buddhist Vihara. The first American woman ordained in Sri Lanka, Ayya Sudhamma has been recognized at the United Nations in Bangkok as an "Outstanding Woman in Buddhism."

== Early life ==
Born in Charlotte, NC, in 1963, Ayya Sudhamma graduated from New York University's School of Law and subsequently practiced law in San Francisco.

== Ordination and teaching ==
In 1999, Ayya Sudhamma became a sāmaṇerī or female Buddhist novice at the Bhavana Society under the tutelage of Henepola Gunaratana. In early 2003, she traveled to South Asia, where she became the first American-born woman to gain bhikkhuni ordination in the Theravada school in Sri Lanka.

In July 2003, she returned to the United States at the invitation of the Carolina Buddhist Vihara in Greenville, South Carolina, as a resident and teacher.

In 2013, after spending a year at Santi Forest Monastery she returned to her birth town of Charlotte for the founding of the Charlotte Buddhist Vihara, where she resides as abbess and Bhikkhuni.

== Achievements ==
In 2005 she participated in the founding of the North American Bhikkhuni Association.

In 2006, on International Women's Day, she was recognized for her achievements as an Outstanding Woman in Buddhism at the United Nations in Bangkok, Thailand.

In 2007 she co-organized and hosted an "historic" meeting of nine bhikkhunis from various locations at her dwelling, the Carolina Buddhist Vihara, to recite the Pātimokkha. This marked the first gathering of Theravada bhikkhunis outside of Asia to recite the Patimokkha or to engage in any official act of Sangha (sanghakamma). As one participant stated,

The holding of this ceremony means that a Sangha–a Theravada Bhikkhuni Sangha–now exists in America. We are no longer just scattered individuals, but have come together united and in harmony. This is the main significance of the Patimokkha Recitation Gathering. This is the first place that this has ever been done, in Theravada, outside of Asia. Following Sri Lanka, America has now become the second place where the Theravada Bhikkhuni Sangha has been revived and established."

Two days after the Patimokkha recitation, the group held a Kathina ceremony, another first achievement for Theravada bhikkhunis outside of Asia. It also was the largest gathering of Theravada bhikkhunis that had yet occurred in the USA, as they had not before gathered in groups larger than twos or threes.

== See also ==
- Therīgāthā
- Henepola Gunaratana
- Dhammadharini Vihara
- Abhayagiri Buddhist Monastery

== Sources ==
- Bhāvanā Society Forest Monastery (2007), Preserving the Dhamma: Felicitations, Recollections and Dhamma Articles in Honor of the Eightieth Birthday of Bhante Henepola Gunaratana, Mahā Thera. Retrieved May 14, 2010, from https://web.archive.org/web/20171118104155/http://www.bhavanasociety.org/pdfs/PreservingTheDhamma.pdf.
- Bhāvanā Society Forest Monastery (Winter 2008), "Western Bhikkhuni Sangha's First Meeting" in Bhāvanā News. Retrieved May 14, 2010, from https://web.archive.org/web/20110725070148/http://www.bhavanasociety.org/pdfs/BhavanaNewsletter_Winter_08.pdf.
- Carolina Buddhist Vihara (n.d.), "Bhikkhuni Sudhamma Bio." Retrieved May 14, 2010, from https://web.archive.org/web/20100907212752/http://carolinabuddhist.net/bhikkhunisudhammabio.html.
- Outstanding Women in Buddhism (2006), "The Outstanding Women in Buddhism Awards: Hall of Recipients 2006." Retrieved May 14, 2010 from https://web.archive.org/web/20110114014726/http://www.owbaw.org/2006.asp.
- Charlotte Buddhist Vihara (n.d.) "Founding Resident Bhikkhunis" Retrieved May 1, 2015 from https://web.archive.org/web/20150426231047/http://www.charlottebuddhistvihara.org/residents-2/
