= Shwe Zan Aung =

Rakhine scholar (1871–1932)

- ရွှေဇံအောင်
- Born: January 20, 1871; Akyab, Arakan Division, British Burma
- Died: May 11, 1932 (aged 61); Yangon, Burma
- Education: Rangoon College (B.A.)
- Writing career
- Genre: Buddhist Abhidhamma
- Notable awards: Doctor of Literature (Yangon University)

U Shwe Zan Aung (Burmese: ရွှေဇံအောင်; 20 January 1871 – 11 May 1932) was a Rakhine scholar, translator and civil servant from Myanmar, who first introduced the Theravada Abhidhamma (Buddhist philosophy) texts to the Western world. He was the first to translate the ancient Buddhist Abhidhamma texts into English. While working as a highly respected officer in the British colonial administration in Burma, he studied Buddhist teachings in depth and began publishing articles in both Burmese and English in Buddhism Magazine and the Journal of the Burma Research Society.

By the early 20th century, Rakhine State had become known for producing a number of nationally significant figures. Among them, Shwe Zan Aung stood out as an honorable one of exceptional ability.

== Early life ==
Shwe Zan Aung was born on January 20, 1871, in Akyab (now Sittwe), Arakan State, British Burma. He was the son of U Shwe Thar, who held distinguished honors including I.S.O. and K.S.M., and Daw A Phyu Zan. His father served as the District Superintendent of Police under British Burma. He was the second of four siblings. In his early years, he was described as tall for his age, with a slim build and fair complexion.

He began his education in 1881 at the Government Middle School in Akyab. He later continued his studies at the State High School in Rangoon, where he matriculated in 1887. He then enrolled at Rangoon College and earned a Bachelor of Arts (B.A.) degree in 1891.

== Civil service ==
He entered Government service in 1892 in the Department of Education and, the following year, was posted to the Land Records Department. In 1894, he was transferred to Kyaukse. After nine years of service, he moved in 1903 to the Burma Subordinate Civil Service in Rangoon. He was promoted in 1907 to Land Requisition Officer in the Provincial Civil Service. In 1912, he was entrusted with land acquisition duties for the Twante Canal project, and in 1913 he conducted a special tenure enquiry in the town of Syriam (Thanlyin). As Sub-divisional Officer of Kyauktan in 1918, he successfully raised a substantial amount for the Second War Loan.

He served twice as Officiating Deputy Commissioner of Hanthawaddy before being appointed Officiating Secretary to the Financial Commissioner of Burma in 1920. He was later posted as Deputy Commissioner of Thaton. After more than thirty years of service, he retired in 1926 due to health issue. He was later awarded the title K.S.M. in recognition of his distinguished career.

== Literary life ==
In 1894, while working in the Land Records Department, he was moved to Kyaukse. During this time, Buddhist monks helped him gain access to religious learning, and he began studying Buddhist scriptures in depth. From 1895, he formally studied Buddhist teachings under the guidance of the monastery head monk U Gandama and the famous scholar monk Ledi Sayadaw.

While working as a government officer, he learned English as well as classical languages like Latin, Pali, and Sanskrit. His article, “The Processes of Thought,” was published in 1900 and received attention from readers around the world. It helped introduce Abhidhamma philosophy to Western scholars, including Mrs. Rhys Davids, who was the president of the Pali Text Society in London.

Mrs. Rhys Davids became interested in his work and contacted him directly. They later exchanged ideas closely. At her request, U Shwe Zan Aung translated the Abhidhammaṭṭhasaṅgaha into English and sent it to her for review. She studied both his version and the original carefully for about three years. After this, he improved the translation by combining feedback from both texts and produced a revised book called Compendium of Philosophy. The first edition was published in London in 1910 by the Pali Text Society, and a second edition was released in 1925.

In 1932, Rangoon College nominated him for the title of Doctor of Literature in recognition of his work.

== Death ==
On May 11, 1932, he passed away at his residence, Nanda Wun, Enit Street, Kyimyindaing Township, Yangon. On his deathbed, he was listening to sermons delivered by monks.

== Personal life ==
Shwe Zan Aung married Daw Tin in 1893. They had two children.
