= Sīlānanda =

Burmese Buddhist monk (1927-2005)

Sayadaw U Sīlānanda
- Title: Agga Maha Pandita, Agga Maha Saddhammajotika Dhaja, Sasanadhaja Siripavara Dhammacariya and Pariyattisasanahita Dhammacariya

Personal life
- Born: 16 December 1927 Mandalay, British Burma
- Died: 13 August 2005 (aged 77) Half Moon Bay, California
- Education: Kelly High School; University College Columbo

Religious life
- Religion: Buddhism
- Temple: Mahavijjodaya Chaung Monastery; Abhyarama Shwegu Taik Monastery; Dhammananda Vihara, California, USA
- School: Theravada
- Lineage: Shwegyin Nikaya
- Dharma names: Sīlānanda (သီလာနန္ဒ)

Senior posting
- Students: Vimalaraṁsi, Nandisena
- Awards: Dhammacariya (1950); Abhivamsa (1954)

U Sīlānanda (Burmese: သီလာနန္ဒ) was a Burmese Buddhist monk and Vipassana meditation scholar. He was also the first rector of the International Theravada Buddhist Missionary University.

== Brief biography ==
Born in Mandalay, he first ordained as a novice monk (samanera) on 14 April 1943 at the age of 16, during Thingyan celebrations. He was ordained under Sayadaw U Pannavata at the Mahavijjodaya Chaung Monastery on the Sagaing Hills and given the Dhamma name Sīlānanda. He attended the Kelly High School, an American Baptist mission school, before entering the monkhood.

On 2 July 1947, he underwent higher ordination at the same monastery. Four days later, he was re-ordained at Mandalay's Payagyi monastery. From 1946 to 1948, he passed three grades of the Burmese government religious examinations and given the status of Dhammacariya (Master of the Dhamma in 1950 and was conferred the title Sasanadhaja Siripavara Dhammacariya. In 1950, he was ordained once again, at Rangoon's Kyaungtawya Shwegyin monastery. In 1954, he gained an honorific suffix -abhivamsa for passing the religious examination of the Pariyattisasanahita Association in Mandalay. He travelled to University College Columbo and passed GCE Advanced Level Examinations with distinctions in Sanskrit and Pali.

In 1960, he became the chief abbot of the Mahavijjodaya Chaung monastery, where he had been ordained as a novice monk. In 1968, he moved to Abyarama Shwegu Taik monastery in Mandalay, and presided as chief abbot. He also served as the spiritual advisor of the Theravada Buddhist Society of America (TBSA) and abbot of TBSA's Dhammananda Vihara monastery in the United States.

He taught Buddhist scriptures at Sagaing's Atothokdayone Pali University and Mandalay Arts and Sciences University and compiled the Tipitaka Pali-Burmese dictionary and became a distinguished editor of the Pali Canon at the Sixth Buddhist council in Rangoon. He taught Pali language at Mandalay University, too.

In 1999, at the request of Sitagu Sayadaw, he agreed to become rector of International Theravada Buddhist Missionary University, opened in the same year. He was succeeded by Ashin Nandamalabhivamsa after his death in 2005.

He died of a brain tumor on 13 August 2005 at the age of 78 in Northern California.

== Family ==
He came from a distinguished family, born to Wunnakyawhtin Saya Saing, a renowned Burmese architect, and Daw Mone. His two brothers and two nephews are also prominent Burmese architects. Silananda's brother Ngwe Hlaing and his nephew Than Tun designed a replica of the Karaweik royal barge on Yangon's Kandawgyi Lake. His sister Daw Sandasari (ဒေါ်သန္တာစာရီ) is the chief abbess of Shwezedi Sathintaik near Sasanapala River on the Sagaing Hills.

== Honours ==
In 1993, "Aggamahā Paṇḍita" was bestowed on him as a Buddhist honorific title by the Myanmar government and in 1999 he received "Aggamahā Saddhammajotikadhaja". On 26 October 2000, Yangon University conferred the Doctor of Letters (Honoris Causa) on Sayadaw U Silananda for his impressive qualifications. In 2005, he received the title of Abhidaja Aggamahā Saddhammajotika by the Myanmar government.

== Bibliography ==
=== Myanmar ===
Some notable works in Myanmar are as follows:

- The Biography of Mahasi Sayadaw
- The first sermon of Lord Buddha
- A Course on Sima (သိမ်သင်တန်း)
- A series of Ahbidhamma lectures (book 1–5)
- The Burmese Architect, Saya Saing (ဆရာဆိုင်)
- Tipitaka Pali-Burmese Dictionary (as a chief compiler)
- The Biography of U Narada of Phayagyi monastery, Mandalay

=== English ===
He authored many books in English, some of which are :

- The Four Foundations of Mindfulness (Wisdom Publications, 2002)
- An Introduction to the Law of Kamma (INWARD PATH, 1999)
- An Introduction to the Doctrine of Anatta (No-Soul)
- Meditation Instructions
- The Benefits Of Walking Meditation (Buddhist Publication Society, Bodhi Leaf Series No. 137)
- Paritta Pāḷi & Protective Verses: A Collection of Eleven Protective Suttas (International Theravāda Buddhist Missionary University, Myanmar, 2000)
- Dependent Origination (Paticca-samuppada): The Wheel of Life (2010)

== General References ==
- "World renowned Theravada teacher passes away". The Buddhist Channel. 15 August 2005.
- "Sayadaw U Silananda". Theravada Buddhist Society of America.
