= Shwe Oo Min Sayadaw =

Bhaddanta Shwe Oo Min Sayadaw
- ရွှေဥမင်ဆရာတော်
- Title: Chief Ovadācariya (Mahasi Sāsana Yeiktha); Shwegyin Nikāya Rattaññūmahānāyaka

Personal life
- Born: Maung Chit Nyunt; September 15, 1913 Mokekhamu Village, Kyaikto Township, Mon State, Myanmar
- Died: November 20, 2002 (aged 89)
- Parents: U Than (father); Daw Taing Chone (mother)
- Other names: Shwe U Min Sayadaw; Shin Kosalla; Shin Kawthala; Ashin Kosalla; အရှင်ကောသလ္လ; Bhaddanta Kosalla Mahāthera; Bhaddanta Kawthala Mahāthera
- Occupation: Bhikkhu

Religious life
- Religion: Buddhism
- Order: Shwegyin Nikāya
- School: Theravāda
- Dharma names: Kosalla (Burmese: ကောသလ္လ)
- Ordination: As a samanera: 1922; (by Sayadaw Bhaddanta Nandiya Thera); As a bhikkhu: 11 April 1933; (by Sayadaw Bhaddanta Ariya Thera)

Senior posting
- Teacher: Mahasi Sayadaw; Bhaddanta Nandiya; Bhaddanta Ariya
- Based in: North Okkalapa, Yangon; Mingaladon, Yangon
- Students: Sayadaw U Tejaniya

Shwe Oo Min Sayadaw (Burmese: ရွှေဥမင်ဆရာတော်; 15 September 1913 – 20 November 2002), also known as Shwe U Min Sayadaw, Ashin Kosalla (Burmese: အရှင်ကောသလ္လ), and Bhaddanta Kosalla Mahāthera, was a meditator and Dhamma teacher who established an international meditation center named Shwe Oo Min Dhammasukha Tawya in Burma (Myanmar).

== Early life ==
Shwe Oo Min Sayadaw was born on Monday, 15 September 1913, at 7:48 AM on a full moon day. He was born in Mokekhamu Village, Kyaikto Township, in Mon State, Myanmar, to U Than (father) and Daw Taing Chone (mother). His childhood name was Maung Chit Nyunt, and he was the eldest of five children.

== Monastic life ==
=== Ordination as a samanera ===
As is the tradition in villages throughout Myanmar, Maung Chit Nyunt was ordained as a samanera (novice monk) at the age of 9 in 1922 CE. He was ordained in Kyaikto Township, Myanmar, specifically at Hman Kyaung ("East Monastery"), a monastery under the patronage of Sayadaw Bhaddanta Nandiya Thera, and was given the name Shin Kosalla (Burmese transliteration: Kawthala). In 1930 CE, as a novice, he was sent to Nyaunglebin Ywama Dhamma Kyaung in Nyaunglebin Township, Bago Region, to study the Dhamma (Buddhist teachings) and Vinaya ("Monastic Discipline").

=== Ordination as a bhikkhu ===
In 1933, at the age of 20, Shin Kosalla was fully ordained as a bhikkhu by Sayadaw Bhaddanta Ariya Thera Aggamahāpaṇḍita. His parents, U Than and Daw Taing Chone, together with U Tha Nyunt and Daw Shwe Chain from Ywama Yat Village, Nyaunglebin Township, jointly provided the four monastic requisites for the ordination.

=== Search for truth ===
In his search for truth (Dhamma), Shwe Oo Min Sayadaw undertook Pariyatti education, which included learning the Pali language, studying the Tipiṭaka (Suttapiṭaka, Vinayapiṭaka, and Abhidhammapiṭaka), as well as the Aṭṭhakathā (commentaries) and Ṭīkā (sub-commentaries) texts, under the guidance of the following prominent teachers:

- Bhaddanta Nandiya, sayadaw of Hman Kyaung Monastery in Mukkhamu Village, Kyaikto Township, Mon State.
- Bhaddanta Ālāra (or Alaya) Aggamahāpaṇḍita, sayadaw of Kyauk Kone Tawya Medini Monastery in Yangon Region.
- Bhaddanta Kesara (or Ketaya) Nāing-ngan-daw Ovadācariya, sayadaw of Inn Waing Tawya Monastery in Nyaunglebin Township, Bago Region.
- Bhaddanta Paññinda (or Panyansataw), sayadaw of the Nyaunglebin Tawya Monastery branch in Thaton Township, Mon State.

=== Encounter with the Mahasi method ===
Shwe Oo Min Sayadaw also spent time studying meditation with Bhaddanta Sobhita (or Tawbitha), a highly respected monk over a hundred years old, who was the sayadaw of Pacchimarāma (or Pyitsama Yon) Monastery in Kyaiklat Town, Ayeyarwady Region. Not much is known about his early years of meditation, but even as a young monk, he combined meditation practice with scriptural study.

He began his active service at Pyitsama Yon Monastery (also known as Yar Kyaw Sayadaw Monastery) in Kyaiklat Township, Ayeyarwady Region, under the guidance of Sayadaw Bhaddanta Tawbitha Mahāthera. Working together with Yar Kyaw Sayadaw, in 1939, he arrived at Khawe Taung Village, specifically at Padanikaryon Tawya Monastery, Shwegyin Township, Bago Region, to undergo intensive meditation practice.

In 1949, in collaboration with Sayadaw Bhaddanta Ketaya of the Shwe Oo Min Sar Thin Thike Dhamma School, he established Kathitwine Yeiktha located near Ahbyar Village, Waw Township, Bago Region. At this meditation center, he settled down to practice and teach vipassanā meditation to laypeople.

As the Vipassanā Movement grew, he went to the Mahāsi Sāsana Meditation Center in Yangon to deepen his practice under the guidance of the Venerable Mahāsi Sayadaw (Bhaddanta Sobhana). In the same year (1949), he was appointed as the chief training instructor at the meditation center. Later in 1951, Mahāsi Sayadaw gave him full responsibility as a Meditation Teacher.

From 1951 to 1961, he stayed at Mahasi Sasana Yeiktha, Bahan Township, Yangon Region. During this period, he served as the Chief Ovadacariya Sayadaw (Chief Advisory Sayadaw) tasked with providing meditation practice guidance to devotees and practitioners (yogis). At the same time, he continued to deepen his understanding of the meditation tradition directly from Mahāsi Sayadaw.

=== Intensive meditation training ===
From a young age, Shwe Oo Min Sayadaw demonstrated diligence, dedication, and vigorous effort in his meditation practice. To deepen his practice, he routinely undertook retreats in forest monasteries and continued to do so well into his late eighties at the following locations:

- In Bago Region:
  - Padānikārāma Tawya in Khe Ywe Village, Shwegyin Township.
  - Sinpon Tawya near Wanbae Inn Village, Bago Township.
  - Mahābodhi Tawya near Kyauktann Village, Bago Township.
  - Nārani Tawya near Phaya Thounzu Village, Bago Township.
  - Kathik Waing Meditation Center near Abya Village, Waw Township, Bago Region.
- In Yangon Region:
  - Nyaung Kokkine Tawya in Kawmhu Gyaung Village, Kawmhu Township.
  - Bodhi Koun Monastery, Bahan Township, Yangon.
- In Mon State:
  - Mon Sein Tawya near Asin Village, Ye Township.
  - Kyauk Aing Dhammasukha Tawya near Banbwegoun Village, Paung Township.
  - Pawdawmu Monastery in Winka Village, Bilin Township, Mon State.

=== Establishment of meditation center ===
Shwe Oo Min Sayadaw was known as one of the most senior monks in the sangha led by Mahāsi Sayadaw. Around the 1960s, he decided to leave the organization and began teaching at a more modest monastery. He founded his own monastery named Shwe Oo Min Kyaung Thike near the Shwe Oo Min Pagoda in Payaw Sakekone, North Okkalapa Township. In 1961, exactly on the full moon day of the month of Waso, he completely moved from Mahasi Yeiktha to his new monastery which later became known as Shwe Oo Min Tawya Dhamma Yeiktha and began his independent ministry. This step was taken because he believed that a simpler approach was more aligned with the essence of meditation practice. Nevertheless, he asserted that his teaching method was not his own creation, but purely followed the Buddha's teachings ("the Buddha's method").

=== Influence and later years ===
Following the passing of Mahāsi Sayadaw in 1982, Shwe Oo Min Sayadaw was offered the position of chief incumbent teacher at Mahāsi Yeiktha, a highly prestigious position in Myanmar. However, he declined the offer on the grounds that such administrative responsibilities would diminish his time for personal meditation practice.

Dedication to meditation practice was Shwe Oo Min Sayadaw's hallmark. In Myanmar as well as in the international community, he was widely known for his mastery of the Cittānupassanā (contemplation of the mind) method. Unlike many other prominent figures, he was known as someone who did not chase popularity and maintained a humble demeanor.

Until the age of 88, he was reported to have continued practicing consistently throughout the day. Observers often noted the sharpness of his mindfulness and mental clarity even in his twilight years. Although he no longer taught routinely in his old age, he remained willing to receive discussions or interviews by prior appointment.

== Final passing ==
Shwe Oo Min Sayadaw is believed to have attained parinibbāna (passing away as one who has reached Nibbāna, final enlightenment) on 20 November 2002, which coincided with the first full moon day of the month of Tazaungmon, in the year 1364 of the Myanmar Era. He passed away at the age of 90, after completing 70 Vassa as a monk.

His passing was viewed by his followers as the achievement of final liberation from samsara. In Myanmar and among international meditation practitioners, he is highly revered as an arahant who achieved full spiritual clarity through a lifelong practice of meditation.

== Social service ==
In addition to being a meditation teacher, Shwe Oo Min Sayadaw also paid great attention to education and social welfare, especially in his native village of Mokekhamu, in Mon State. In the village, he initiated the construction of a new monastery (Okpho Dhamma Yeik Tha Kyaung) with a funding allocation of 21 million kyat, which also included a program to provide uniforms, stationery, and books for local schoolchildren.

He also expanded his social services by initiating the construction of a high school building in Kyaikkatha Village through a separate funding provision of 21 million kyat. In addition to supporting secular education, he personally set aside time to teach basic Dhamma and Buddhist culture classes to youth and the surrounding community.

In the fields of literacy and infrastructure, he established a total of nine libraries in the Kyaikto Township area, and built a power station co-managed with local industry to supply electricity to the entire Mokekhamu Village.

== Teaching method ==
Like other sayadaws in Myanmar, Shwe Oo Min Sayadaw taught vipassanā meditation. However, the method he emphasized had a unique approach as it focused entirely on Cittānupassanā (mindfulness of the mind). Instead of making physical sensations the primary object, his method made the noting mind the main anchor of observation.

In practice, he taught that meditation should be done with a relaxed mind without creating tension, and that mindfulness should be applied in all aspects of daily life. This is encapsulated in the book Contemplation of the Mind:

"‘There should always be the greatest effort possible without forcing, without creating tension.’‘Insight comes from the realization that observation is going on without the observer. Witnessing is going on without the witness.’" "With all practices, in all postures: standing, walking, sitting, lying down, eating, etc. Watch the mind."

Although his method is often considered to have its own distinct characteristics, he always rejected the idea that it was his own creation. He asserted, "This is not my own way of teaching, but rather the Buddha's way itself."

The most well-known literary contribution of his method is the book Contemplation of the Mind: Practising Cittanupassana compiled by his disciple, Bhikkhu Khemavamsa (an Australian monk). The book is a compilation of the essence of Shwe Oo Min Sayadaw's talks containing mental attitude guidance for meditation practitioners.

== Lineage of successors ==
Following the passing of Shwe Oo Min Sayadaw in 2002, the teaching lineage and responsibilities at the Shwe Oo Min Dhamma Sukha Tawya meditation center were continued by his primary disciple, Sayadaw U Tejaniya, who had been personally trained by him to carry on this Cittānupassanā tradition.

== See also ==
- Mahasi Sayadaw
- Sayadaw U Tejaniya
- Shwegyin Nikāya
- Buddhism in Myanmar
- Pa-Auk Sayadaw
- Ledi Sayadaw

== Bibliography ==
- Khemavamsa, Bhikkhu (2004). Contemplation of the Mind: Practising Cittanupassana (PDF). An Inward Journey Book (Revised ed.). Penang: Inward Path. ISBN 983-9439-78-2.
- Paw, Maung (2002). The Life Story of Shwe Oo Min Sayadaw Bhaddanta Kawthala Maha Thera (PDF). Translation from the original Burmese edition published by Shwe Oo Min Tawya Dhamma Sukkha Yeiktha. California: Dhamma Dana.
- Tejaniya, Sayadaw U. "Lineage". Sayadaw U Tejaniya (Website).
