= Tathālokā Bhikkhunī =

Buddhist monastic teacher

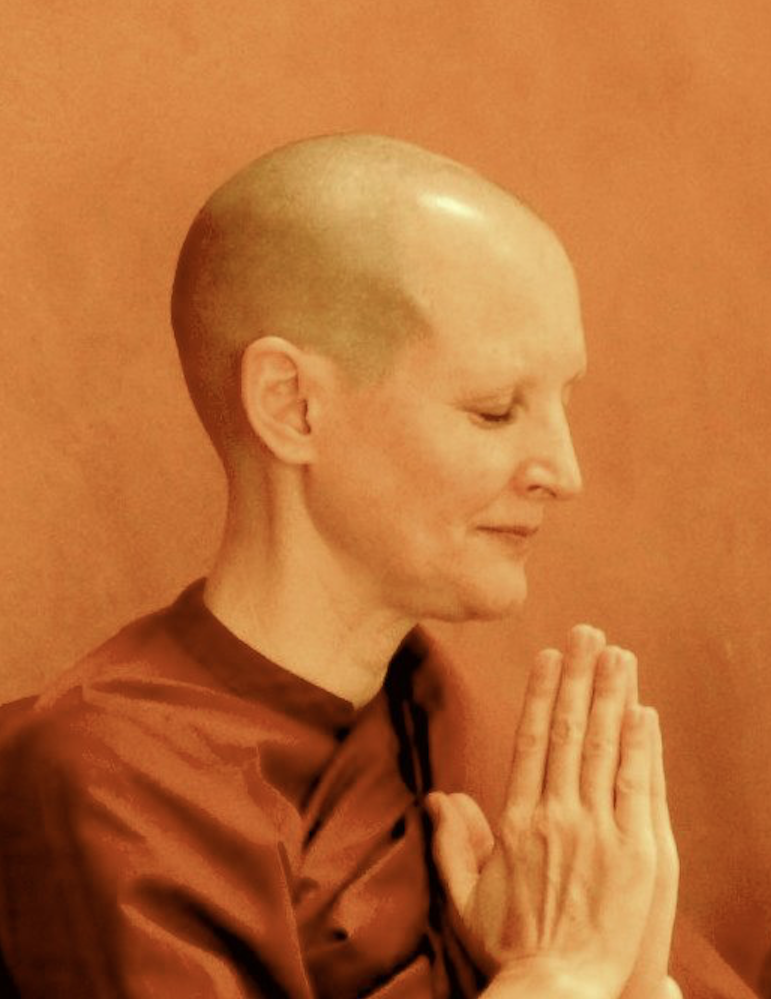
- Tathālokā Bhikkhunī at Dhammadharini Monastery, 2019

Personal life
- Born: Heather Buske; 1968 (age 57–58) Washington, D.C., U.S.

Religious life
- Religion: Buddhism

Venerable Bhikkhunī (Ayya) Tathālokā Mahātherī is an American-born Theravada Bhikkhunī, scholar and Buddhist teacher. She is also the co-founder of the Dhammadharini monastic community in California, which includes Dhammadharini Monastery (formerly Dhammadharini Vihara), and Aranya Bodhi Hermitage. She was the recipient of the 2006 Outstanding Women in Buddhism Award, a presenting scholar at the 2007 International Congress on Buddhist Women's Role in the Sangha, and was appointed Preceptor for the historically-significant 2009 Bhikkhuni Ordination held in Perth, Australia.

== Early life ==
Born Heather Buske in Washington, D.C., in 1968, Venerable Tathālokā’s parents encouraged her to develop the skills necessary to look for what is true. She had early exposure to the texts of the Pali Canon, and was inspired by reading the Bhikkhunīs at the time of the Buddha. At the age of 19, after the sudden death of an associate, she left college to pursue monastic life, first in Europe and then in India.

== Early monastic life ==
In 1988, Venerable Tathālokā first entered monastic life as an Anagārika, and two years later received ten-precept ordination as a novice in India. Seeking to connect with the ancient lineage of the Bhikkhunī Sangha, she traveled to South Korea where that lineage was still established. There she was accepted as the student of her Bhikkhunī mentor, the most venerable Bhikkhunī elder Myeong Seong Sunim (Hanja: 和法界 明星), who gave her the name "Tatha-alokā" (Hanja: 如光, Thai: ตถาโลกา, Sinhala: තථාලෝකා).

Venerable Tathālokā received the "going forth" (pabbajja) and took dependency (nissaya) with her bhikkhuni mentor in 1993, and undertook the samaneri precepts with the late most venerable Mountain Forest Meditation Tradition Bhikkhu masters Hye Am Sunim (慧菴堂 性觀大宗師) as Preceptor and Il Tah Sunim (日陀大師) as Acariya in 1995. Venerable Tathālokā trained under the guidance of Myeong Seong Sunim for ten years.

After returning to the United States in 1996, Venerable Tathālokā received the full bhikkhuni ordination in 1997, at a gathering of Bhikkhu and Bhikkhuni Sanghas in Southern California. The Chief Prelate of the Western Hemisphere, Most Venerable Dr. Havanpola Ratanasara Nayaka Mahathero, served as her preceptor (upajjhaya). Venerable Tathālokā was the first non-Sri Lankan woman to receive Bhikkhunī ordination into the Theravāda tradition in modern times.

== Studies and influences ==
Venerable Tathālokā, as one of the earliest women to receive full ordination in the revival of the Bhikkhuni Sangha, has conducted extensive research into Comparative Bhikkhuni Vinaya and World Bhikkhuni Sangha History. These were the subject of her graduate studies at Unmunsa in South Korea.

Ven. Tathālokā has studied and trained with Indian, Korean, Thai, Sri Lankan and Burmese meditation teachers, including the Thai Forest Tradition of the most venerable Ajahn Mun Bhuridatta, and the Burmese Vipassana meditation masters Sayadaw U Pandita and Pa-Auk Sayadaw. Her practice and teaching are strongly influenced by the canonical Early Buddhist Suttas, together with the teachings and practices of Forest and Insight meditation traditions.

She has studied in South Korea, Thailand and other countries, and has taught around the world.

== Founding of the Dhammadharini Community ==
Venerable Tathālokā's mentor, Ajahn Maha Prasert of the Thai Forest Tradition, and many others encouraged her to open the first Theravada women's monastic residence in the Western United States. In 2005, with community support, she opened Dhammadharini Vihara in the Niles District of Fremont, California, United States, and served as Abbess.

She was honored with the 2006 Outstanding Women in Buddhism award, at the United Nations in Bangkok, Thailand. Venerable Tathālokā Theri was also a presenter at the International Congress on Buddhist Women's Role in the Sangha, in Hamburg, Germany, August 2007.

== See also ==
- Dhammadharini Vihara
- Women in Buddhism
