= Abhidhammattha-sangaha =

Compendium of the Abhidhamma of the Theravāda tradition

- OpenTipitaka
- Type: Compendium text
- Parent: Pāli literature
- Compendium on: Abhidhamma Piṭaka
- Attribution: Ācariya Anuruddha
- Abbreviation: AbhS; Saṅgaha
- Related: Abhidhammatthavibhāvinīṭīkā; Abhidhammatthasaṅgahaṭīkā

The Abhidhammattha-saṅgaha (English: The Compendium of Things contained in the Abhidhamma; Chinese: 攝阿毘達磨義論) is a Pali Buddhist instructional manual or compendium of the Abhidhamma of the Theravāda tradition. It was written by the Sri Lankan monk Ācariya Anuruddha some time between the 8th century and the 12th century.

According to Bhikkhu Bodhi, the Abhidhammattha-saṅgaha is one of the most important texts in the Theravāda Abhidhamma tradition and it provides such a "masterly summary" of the Abhidhamma that "has become the standard primer for Abhidhamma studies throughout the Theravāda Buddhist countries of South and Southeast Asia."

== Overview ==
As noted by Bhikkhu Bodhi, the growth of the Theravāda Abhidhamma into a complex and massive textual tradition, that included both the already large and difficult Abhidhamma Pitaka and numerous commentaries by exegetes like Buddhaghosa (which fills more than 40 volumes in the PTS latin script edition), made it difficult to study for novices. Thus, there arose a need for concise summaries for teaching novices. While there were various texts written for this purpose, the fifty page saṅgaha became the most popular such text because of "its remarkable balance between concision and comprehensiveness."

Ācariya Anuruddha did not introduce any new content or doctrines into the Theravāda Abhidhamma in this text, the work is a compendium or textbook of doctrine. His sources include the Abhidhamma Pitaka and the Visuddhimagga of Buddhaghosa. However, his organization and systematization of Abhidhamma content is unique and innovative. According to Jeffrey Wayne Bass, Anuruddha organized the text with an emphasis on the domain of experience (avacara) in which a given type of consciousness may be encountered. He presents the Abhidharma content into a stratified schema which mirrors Buddhist meditative development (from ordinary mind states to higher states of jhana). Thus, it is also a text which can be seen as a guide to meditative attainment.

Anuruddha also condensed Abhidhamma teachings by introducing new categories such as "universal" mental factors (sabbacittasadharana), which allowed him to present the material in a much shorter form (in contrast to the Dhammasangani for example). This conciseness made it easy to memorize and transmit, and likely contributed to its popularity.

== Outline of chapters ==
The Abhidhammattha-sangaha consists of the following chapters:

- Chapter I - Compendium of consciousness (Pali: citta-sangaha-vibhāgo). Defines and classifies the 89 and 121 cittas or types of consciousness.
- Chapter II - Compendium of mental factors (cetasika) or concomitants of consciousness. This chapter enumerates fifty-two mental factors (Pali: cetasikas) or concomitants of consciousness, divided into four classes: universals, occasionals, unwholesome factors, and beautiful factors. It also delves into 89 classes of consciousness, the qualities of matter, rebirth, meditative exercises and relationships between phenomena.
- Chapter III - Miscellaneous, classifies cittas and cetasikas with respect to six categories: root (hetu), feeling (vedana), function (kicca), door (dvara), object (arammana), and base (vatthu).
- Chapter IV - Analysis of the cognitive process
- Chapter V - Process-Freed
- Chapter VI - Compendium of Matter (rupa), enumerates and classifies material phenomena and explains their modes of origination.
- Chapter VII - Compendium of Categories. This arranges the dhammas outlined in the previous chapters into four broad headings: a compendium of defilements; a compendium of mixed categories; a compendium of the requisites for enlightenment; a compendium of the whole.
- Chapter VIII - Compendium Of Relations or Conditionality. It analyzes the relationships between dhammas in terms of dependent origination as well as the 24 conditional relations outlined in the Patthana.
- Chapter IX - Compendium of meditation subjects, drawing on the Visuddhimagga, deals with the forty subjects of meditation and the stages of progress.

== Exegesis ==
=== Commentaries ===
Because of its short length, this text has been difficult to understand, and therefore various commentaries have been written on it:

- Abhidhammattha-sangaha-Tika, also known as the Porana-Tika, "the Old Commentary." A 12th century Sri Lankan commentary by an elder named Acariya Navavimalabuddhi.
- Abhidhammattha-vibhavini-Tika, written by Acariya Sumangalasami, 12th century. The most famous and widely used commentary.
- Ledi Sayadaw's (1846-1923) Paramattha-dipani-tika, which criticizes the Vibhavini-tika on 245 points and aroused much debate.
- Ankura-Tika, by Vimala Sayadaw, defends the opinions of the Vibhavini against Ledi Sayadaw's criticisms.
- Navanita-Tika, by the Indian scholar Dhammananda Kosambi, 1933. Titled "The Butter Commentary," because it explains the Sangaha in a smooth and simple manner, avoiding philosophical controversy.
- "A Comprehensive Manual of Abhidhamma" by Narada Thera, Bhikkhu Bodhi and U Rewata Dhamma includes an English language introduction and explanatory commentary as well as numerous tables by U Silananda. It draws from both the Vibhavini-Tika and the Paramattha-dipani-tika, focusing on their convergences and complementary contributions instead of their conflicting points. It also draws from the Visuddhimagga.

=== Points of controversy ===
Although both are commentaries for the Abhidhammattha-saṅgaha, the Paramattha-dīpanī-ṭīkā (by Ledi Sayadaw) shows disagreements with the Abhidhammattha-vibhāvinī-ṭīkā (by Ācariya Sumaṅgala) on 245 points across its nine chapters:

- 70 points in the compendium of consciousness (cittasaṅgaha),
- 12 points in the compendium of mental factors (cetasikasaṅgaha),
- 32 points in the compendium of the miscellaneous (pakiṇṇakasaṅgaha),
- 26 points in the compendium of the cognitive process (vīthisaṅgaha),
- 34 points in the compendium of the process-freed (vīthimuttasaṅgaha),
- 29 points in the compendium of matter (rūpasaṅgaha),
- 20 points in the compendium of categories (samuccayasaṅgaha),
- 19 points in the compendium of conditions (paccayasaṅgaha), and
- 3 points in the compendium of meditation subjects (kammaṭṭhānasaṅgaha).

These disagreements stem from their different methodological approaches; while the Abhidhammattha-vibhāvinī-ṭīkā attempts to reveal hidden meanings with brief and concise explanations, the Paramattha-dīpanī-ṭīkā presents a highly critical and analytical review. Ledi Sayadaw explicitly rejects various interpretations from previous commentaries that he considers inaccurate, especially from the Vibhāvinī. These rejections do not merely use simple phrases, but employ various firm Pali language critical expressions, usually beginning with the reference "vibhāvaniyaṃ pana" (but in the Vibhāvinī...) followed by dismissals such as "taṃ na yujjati" (that is not appropriate), "taṃ na sundaraṃ" (that is not good), "taṃ sabbaṃ na paccetabbaṃ" (all of that is not to be trusted), "so duppāṭho" (that is a bad reading), to "taṃ aṭṭhakathāya na sameti" (that does not agree with the commentaries/aṭṭhakathā).

This sharp criticism from Ledi Sayadaw subsequently sparked a massive literary debate among Theravāda scholars in Myanmar in the early 20th century. Scholars siding with the Vibhāvinī-ṭīkā responded by writing dozens of new works and sub-commentaries to defend the authority of the Vibhāvinī while counterattacking the arguments of the Dīpanī. Defensive works specifically written for this purpose include:

- Aṅkura-ṭīkā (also known as Thingyo Mahātīkāthitpat) by Sayadaw Vimalābhivaṃsālaṅkāra (1909)
- Paramatthavisodhanī-ṭīkā (Paramatthavisodhanīṭīkā Thit Pāḷi) by Dhammārum Sayadaw U Dīpamālā (1909)
- Abhidhammattha-Anuvibhāvinī by Sayadaw Sāgarābhidhaja (1910)
- Atisundaraṃkyam by U Nat Thar (1910)
- Abhidhammatthavibhāvinīyojanā by Sayadaw Ashin Nānindāsabha (1919)
- Ming Khing Ṭīkākyaw-Ganthi-Thit by Second Ming Khing Sayadaw Bhaddanta Vicārinda (1920)
- Mahāatulaṭīkā by Sayadaw Nāgindasāmithera (1924)

For the Atisundaraṃkyam in particular, the title Atisundara (meaning "very good" or "exceedingly beautiful") was deliberately used as a direct satirical retort to the phrase "taṃ na sundaraṃ" (that is not good) frequently thrown by Ledi Sayadaw in his work.

Regarding the resolution of this debate, modern philological and doctrinal studies have attempted to evaluate the validity of the arguments from both sides. Based on a comparative analysis conducted by Ven. Visuddha (2018) on several selected points of controversy, it was concluded that Ledi Sayadaw's rejection of the interpretations in the Vibhāvinī-ṭīkā often stemmed purely from differing points of view regarding variations in Pali grammatical instrumentals.

== Translations ==
The Abhidhammatthasangaha was first translated into English by Shwe Zan Aung (between 1895 and 1905), and this was revised and edited by Caroline Rhys Davids and first printed in 1910.

The Sangaha was also translated into English by Narada Maha Thera, with explanatory notes.

In 1993, the American monk Bhikkhu Bodhi released an updated version with the title "A comprehensive manual of Abhidhamma", with explanations of each section by Ven. U Rewata Dhamma and numerous charts and tables provided by Ven. U Silananada. A supplement to this text is 'Process of Consciousness and Matter' by Ven. Dr. Rewata Dhamma.

Another translation of the Sangaha by Rupert Gethin and Dr. RP Wijeratne includes the Abhidhammattha-vibhavini commentary by Sumangala and was published in 2002 by the Pali Text Society.

The Abhidhammattha Saṅgaha has also been translated into Spanish. The Argentine monk U. Nandisena, who has devoted himself to translating directly from the Pali into Spanish, is the translator into Spanish of the text: his version, titled Compendio del Abhidhamma, was published by El Colegio de México in 1999, prepared from Bhikkhu Bodhi's general edition of the work. The translation is available online at the Biblioteca Virtual Miguel de Cervantes. A second edition, translating the chapters from the Pali, was in preparation from 2019 by the Instituto de Estudios Buddhistas Hispano.

== Sources ==
- A Comprehensive Manual of Abhidhamma by Bhikkhu Bodhi
- ABHIDHAMMATTHA - SANGAHA, translated by Nārada Thera, Vājirārāma, Colombo
- A Manual of Abhidhamma: Abhidhammattha Sangaha of Bhadanta Anuruddhācariya, edited in the original Pali text with English translation and explanatory notes by Nārada Mahā Thera
