= Ajahn Mudito =

Brazilian Theravada Buddhist monk, founder of Mosteiro Suddhavāri

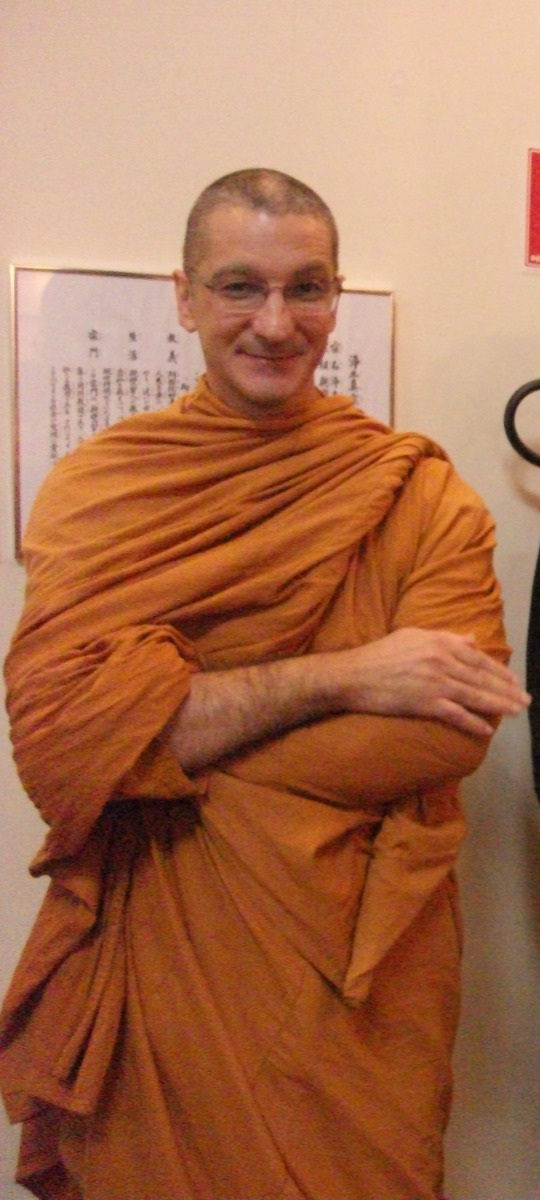
- Ajahn Mudito in 2026
- Title: Founder and abbot of Mosteiro Suddhavāri

Personal life
- Born: 1977 (age 48–49) São Paulo, Brazil
- Occupation: Buddhist monk, translator
- Website: suddhavari.org

Religious life
- Religion: Buddhism
- School: Theravada
- Lineage: Thai Forest Tradition

Senior posting
- Teacher: Ajahn Chah lineage (Luang Po Liem, Luang Po Piak)
- Based in: Mosteiro Suddhavāri, Soledade de Minas, Brazil

Ajahn Mudito (São Paulo, 1977) is a Brazilian Theravada Buddhist monk (bhikkhu) of the Thai Forest Tradition. He is the founder and abbot of the Mosteiro Suddhavāri, in Soledade de Minas (Minas Gerais), the only Brazilian monastery of that tradition, and spiritual director of the Sociedade Budista do Brasil.

He is also known for his work translating into Portuguese the teachings of masters of the forest tradition, made directly from the Thai.

== Biography ==
=== Monastic life ===
Mudito was born in São Paulo in 1977 and began practising meditation as a layman at the Casa de Dharma, a Buddhist centre of that city. After finishing university, without a clear path, he travelled through Europe, Asia, India and Nepal until he reached Thailand. He has recounted that, after a week at a monastery, he stopped while walking with the feeling of having arrived at his destination.

In 2002, at the age of twenty-five, he began the monastic life in Thailand. He entered that year as an anagārika, received the sāmaṇera ordination in 2003 and that of bhikkhu in 2004, at Wat Nong Pah Pong, the main monastery of Ajahn Chah, in Ubon Ratchathani Province, with Luang Po Liem as preceptor (upajjhāya). He resided at Wat Pah Nanachat and at the Vimutti monastery of New Zealand, spent six months with Ajahn Jandee and then settled as a disciple of Luang Po Piak at Wat Pah Cittabhavana, in Pathum Thani Province. He returned to Brazil for the first time in 2013 as a teaching monk.

=== Mosteiro Suddhavāri ===
The monastery began in early 2017. During the process of acquiring the land, Mudito lived alone on the empty property, feeding on the offerings he received. Progressively a meditation platform, huts for monks, rooms for laypeople, a kitchen and the present meditation hall were built. The monastery also carries out native forest replanting.

In 2019 the monastery obtained the status of associated monastery of Wat Nong Pah Pong. In August 2024 Ajahn Mudito acted as preceptor (upajjhāya) in the ordination as novice of the Venerable Medhāvī, who had trained at Suddhavāri and later moved to the Amaravati monastery in the United Kingdom. All its activities, including lodging, are offered free of charge and sustained by voluntary donation.

== Translations ==
Ajahn Mudito has translated into Portuguese teachings of masters of the forest tradition, generally from the Thai. As he has explained, his purpose is to avoid the usual "retranslation", in which texts pass first through English before reaching Portuguese, a process which in his view generates distortions and loss of meaning. The translations are distributed free of charge in digital formats from the monastery's website. He also compiled a biography of Ajahn Chah in Portuguese.

== Activity in Latin America ==
In addition to his work in Brazil, Ajahn Mudito has made teaching tours to other countries of the region. In December 2023 he visited Chile together with Ajahn Tana, at the invitation of the Thai embassy in Santiago. In July 2025 he taught in Chile and Uruguay, and in June 2026 he made a teaching tour of several Chilean cities.

He is also one of the promoters of the Foro Buddhista Theravāda Latino, a gathering of leaders of Theravada communities of the region initiated in 2026.

== See also ==
- Buddhism in Latin America
- Thai Forest Tradition
