= Unmunsa =

South Korean Buddhist temple

Unmun Temple
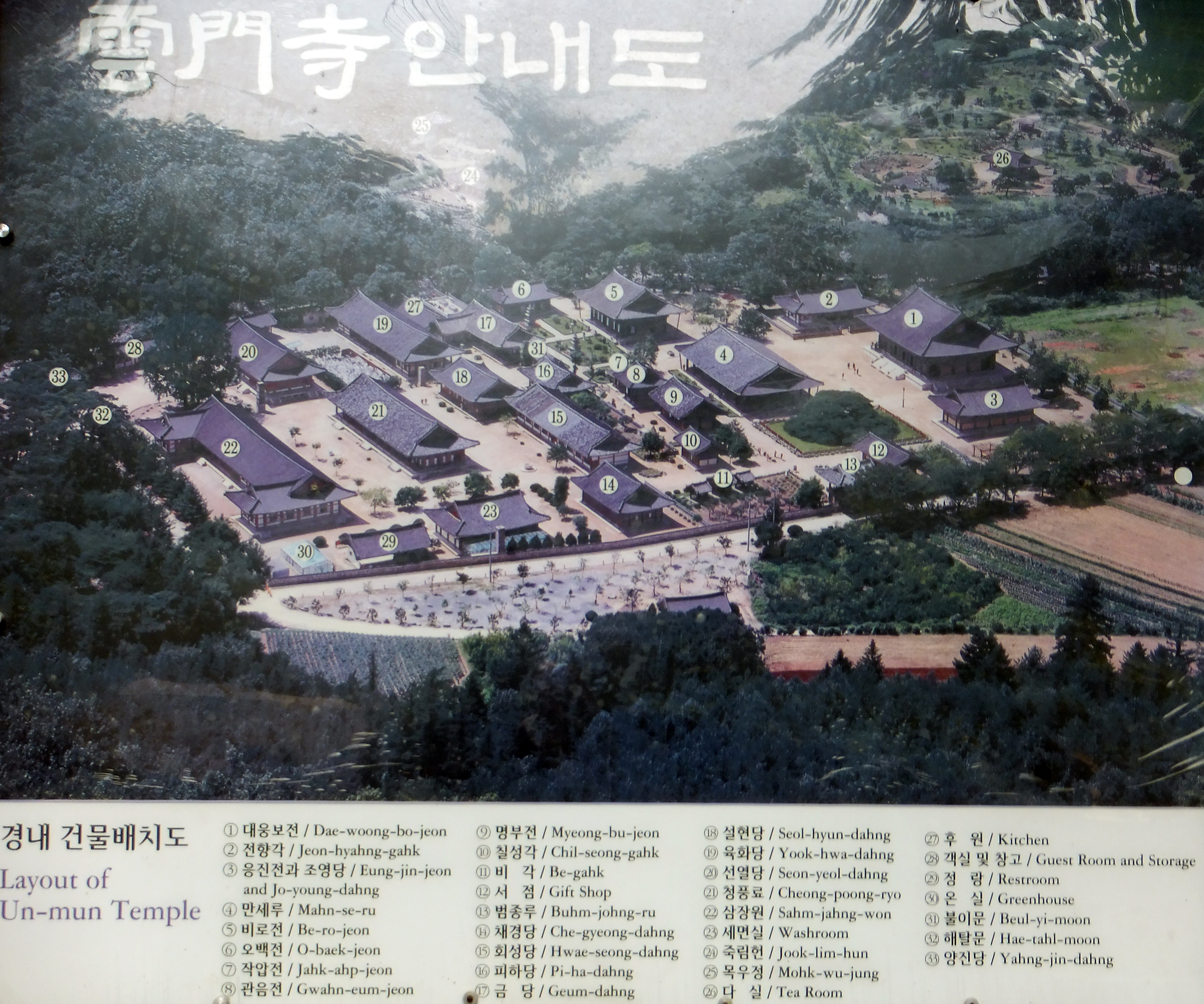
- Layout of the Unmun Temple

- Location within South Korea

Religion
- Affiliation: Buddhism

Location
- Location: Sinwon-ri, Unmun-myeon, Cheongdo County, Gyeongsangbuk-do
- Country: South Korea
- Coordinates: 35.66222°N 128.96111°E

Architecture
- Elevation: 245 m (804 ft)

Website
- http://www.unmunsa.or.kr

Korean name
- Hangul: 운문사
- Hanja: 雲門寺
- RR: Unmunsa
- MR: Unmunsa

Unmun-sa (Korean: 운문사) is a Buddhist temple located on the southernmost part of the Taebaek Mountains in Gyeongsangbuk-do, South Korea. It was built in the 21st year of the reign of King Jinheung (AD 560) . Around the end of the Silla Kingdom, the temple was expanded and renamed as Taejakgap-sa (Korean: 대작갑사; Hanja: 大鵲岬寺, "Great Magpie Hillside Temple"), but its name was changed to its current Unmunsa (Korean: 운문사; Hanja: 雲門寺, "Cloud Gate Temple") in the 20th year of the reign of King Taejo (AD 937). Parts of the temple were destroyed down during the invasion of the Korean peninsula (1592–98) by the Japanese general Toyotomi Hideyoshi.

Unmunsa is a temple of the Jogye Order. In 1950, it became the largest training center for nuns (kor. biguni) in South Korea.

== Gallery ==
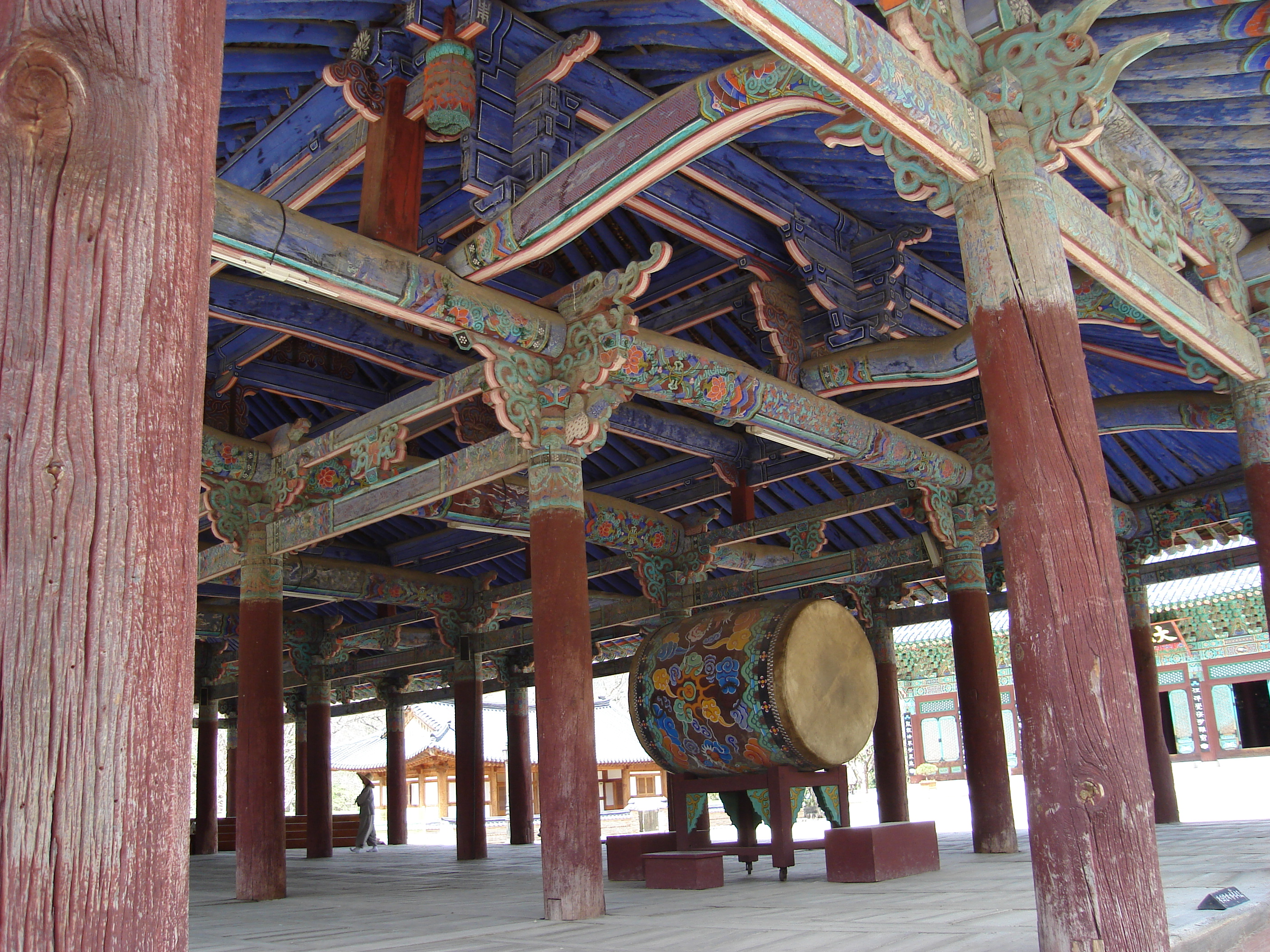
Unmun-sa temple drum in the assembly hall (Mahnseru)

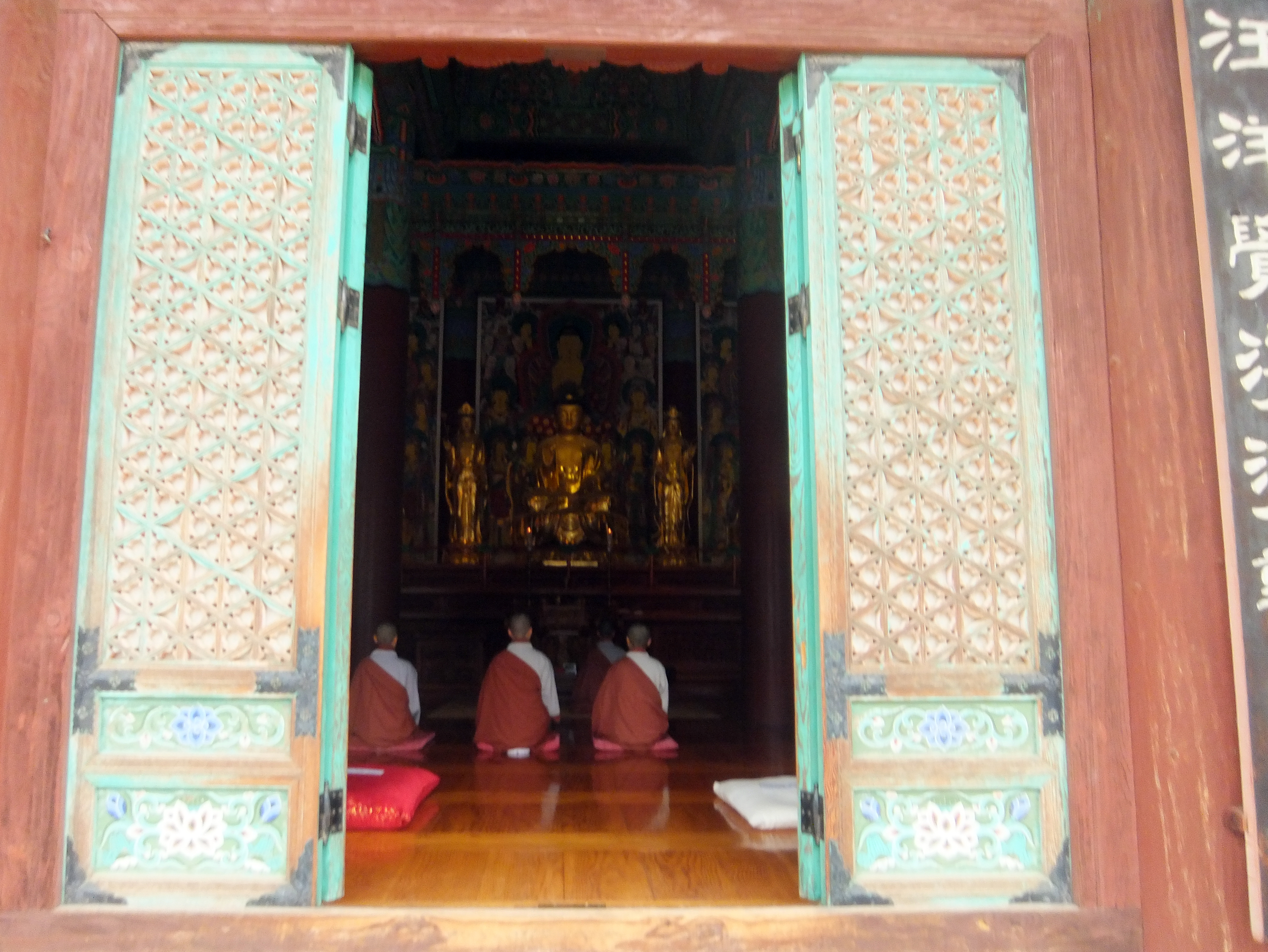
nuns in the "Great Hall" (Daeungjeon)

== See also ==
- Unmunsan

== Literature ==
- Martine Batchelor, Sŏnʼgyŏng (Sŭnim), Women in Korean Zen, Lives And Practices. Syracuse University Press, 2006.
