= Dhammadharini Vihara =

Buddhist monastery in Santa Rosa, California

Dhammadharini Vihara is a Buddhist women's monastic residence (vihara) in the Sonoma Hills of Santa Rosa, California. The name "Dhammadharini" is interpreted as a "holder" or "upholder" (in the feminine) of the Buddhadhamma as a "flowing" or "streaming" reality, teaching and practice. A "vihara" is a monastic residence, and place of Dhamma and meditation teaching and practice.

Dhammadharini Vihara opened the doors at its first temporary, rented location in August 2005, with room for three residents: bhikkhunīs, aspirants and stewards. In 2009, with the offering of a parcel of rescued redwood forest on the Sonoma Coast, Dhammadharini's Awakening Forest Hermitage, Aranya Bodhi, was born. With the development of the hermitage, the original Fremont, CA vihara was transferred to an offered wing in an urban residence near Lake Elizabeth in Fremont. This second temporary lodging for the bhikkhunīs was named the "Bodhi House," and was an in-town outpost related to Aranya Bodhi. After establishment of very basic rustic and rugged facilities at Aranya Bodhi, the Bodhi House was closed, and for one year, the Dhammadharini Sangha lived only at Aranya Bodhi. Meanwhile, a room was offered by Ven. Bhikkhunī Hanhtri Sakya for the Dhammadharini bhikkhunīs with the "I'm for World Peace Foundation" at the Peace Pagoda in Fremont's Niles district nearby the original vihara for the bhikkhunīs to stay when teaching in the San Francisco Bay Area.

Following that year, recognizing the community's need for a more accessible vihara, the Dhammadharini supporters once again rented a temporary vihara, this time in Santa Rosa between Bennett Valley and Sonoma Valley within an hour of Aranya Bodhi Hermitage but closer to the San Francisco Bay Area, while a permanent vihara/monastery venue was sought. After a three year long search, the new Dhammadharini monastery property was found on the full moon of February in 2016 (Sangha Day & the lunar anniversary of Mahapajapati Gotami's parinibbāna) and the property purchase completed by the Dhammadharini Support Foundation on Earth Day of 2016. The new monastery property is located at the western foot of Sonoma Mountain in Penngrove, and has been repaired and renovated for the monastic community's occupancy prior to the 2016 Vassa, when Opening Blessings took place on July 16 & 17.

The original Dhammadharini Vihara was notable as the first Theravāda monastery for women monastics and especially for bhikkhunīs in the western United States. In the Theravada tradition in North America, Buddhist monasteries for women have been rare as compared to in Theravada Buddhism in Asia, in large part due to the lack of equal full ordination for women in the traditions. When Dhammadharini was founded, it became the third bhikkhunī vihara in the entire United States, and the first in Northern California, as compared to more than 60 viharas for bhikkhus (male monks) of Theravada traditions.

A focus of Dhammadharini Support Foundation's mission from the beginning has been to support bhikkhunīs, fully ordained Buddhist women monastics (known as both "female monks" and "fully ordained nuns" in English), and their full living of the monastic life, teaching and leadership. The Vihara observes the annual Vassa of the Theravada South and Southeast Asian traditions, and bhikkhunīs train in the 311 precepts of the Pāli-text Bhikkhunī Paṭimokkha, as well as elements of the Thai Forest Tradition's extra-Vinaya discipline known as Kor Wat. The teaching and practice incorporates elements of the Thai Forest Traditions of Ajahn Chah and Luang Ta Maha Bua, the Sri Lanka forest and Dhamma-teaching related to Ven. Henepola Gunaratana (popularly known as "Bhante G") and other teachers, and the Burmese Vipassana traditions related to both the lineage of Mahasi Sayadaw and the current Pa-Auk sayadaw, Bhaddanta Āciṇṇa.

The founding abbess, Ven. Ayyā Tathālokā Therī, began her entry into monastic life in 1987 at the age of 19, leaving university to do so. She became an anagārikā at age 20 and a novice ten-precept renunciate at age 22, first training and practicing in Europe and then India. She later sought and found a senior bhikkhunī mentor with the well-established Bhikkhunī Sanghas of East Asia in South Korea, undertook dependency with her bhikkhunī mentor in 2003, and undertook samanerī pabbajjā under her mentor's auspices at Haein-sa Monastery in 2005, for the sake of training for bhikkhunī ordination. Expatriated to the United States in 1996, she had the unexpected rare opportunity to fully ordain as a bhikkhunī in Southern California in 1997, with the late most venerable Havanpola Ratanasāra Mahāthero as bhikkhu preceptor, thanks to the organizational support of the first American bhikkhunī, the late Ven. Karuna Dharma.

Since the founding of Dhammadharini in 2005, Ayyā Tathālokā and her bhikkhunī peers, in partnership with the Dhammadharini Support Foundation, have welcomed monastic life aspirants and bhikkhunīs, sāmanerīs and women renunciates from various Buddhist traditions at Dhammadharini Vihara, the Bodhi House and Aranya Bodhi Hermitage. Ayyā Tathālokā offered the first and second anagārikā ordinations at Dhammadharini Vihara in Fremont in 2005 and 2006, and after attaining ten years seniority as a bhikkhunī, she offered the first sāmanerī pabbajjās (going forth as a "female sāmaṇa in training") in Australia and the land that was to become Aranya Bodhi in 2008. She and the Dhammadharini community further offered a series of bhikkhunī camps at Aranya Bodhi, and the first entirely-Theravada Dual Bhikkhunī Ordination in Western Australia in 2009 followed in North America with Dhammadharini at Aranya Bodhi Hermitage in 2010.

For five years, she regularly served as a bhikkhunī preceptor for women, granting various levels of ordination to around 30 women in USA, Australia and Thailand in the ten-year period between 2005 and 2015. For its first ten years Ven. Tathālokā Therī served as abbess of Dhammadharini, retiring from that role in 2014, with a shift to shared, communal leadership among three resident bhikkhunī teachers, including herself, Ven. Sobhanā Therī, and Ven. Suvijjānā Bhikkhunī who has been with the Dhammadharini community for the past ten years. She continues to serve as pavattinī-upajjhāyā (preceptor) and sanghatherī (senior-most monastic in residence) with the Dhammadharini Sangha at Dhammadharini Vihara, and plans to also do so at the new permanent Dhammadharini Monastery in Penngrove when the old vihara closes in July 2016. Dhammadharini has served as host to Ven. Tathālokā Therī's ongoing research into and writings on the history (or her-story) of the Bhikkhunī Sangha, as well as hosting and supporting the Bhikkhunī Vibhanga Project, the Bhikkhunī Patimokkha Third Edition, and numerous other works with and classes on the bhikkhunīs' monastic Vinaya discipline.

The Dhammadharini bhikkhunīs' community and teachers do not ever charge for their teachings and services. Rather, they live as the Buddha did, as alms mendicants, with what is freely given in the spirit of support and generosity. The Dhammadharini bhikkhunīs, from the beginning at Dhammadharini Vihara in Fremont, went on pindapata almsrounds daily, and they continue to go on pindapata almsrounds regularly in the local town of Sebastopol and elsewhere in their area. People also bring foods, medicines and supplies to offer at the vihara, monastery and hermitage when visiting, together with freewill charitable financial donations, which allow the support foundation to cover all operational expenses. The monastics regularly freely offer Dhamma and meditation groups and teachings both at the vihara and with outside meditation groups and at schools and other venues when invited, and they offer sutta study and discussion groups and the opportunity to undertake silā (precepts) at the vihara.

Both the new Dhammadharini Monastery and the Aranya Bodhi Hermitage also offer times of personal retreat for their monastics, trainees and stewards, residential opportunities for exploring monastic life through short and extended-stay visits, and temporary ordination as an 8-precept anagarika; as well as opportunities for highly dedicated aspirants to go forth as a sāmaṇeri and fully ordain and train as a bhikkhunī. As it becomes more and more socially acceptable and common, the number of women who are converting from being other forms of Theravada female monastics such as dasasilamatas, maechees and thilashins is on the rise, as are the number of bhikkhunīs from East Asian Mahāyanā traditions who wish to, and now have the opportunity, to transfer to the Theravāda bhikkhunī way of life, in accordance with their aspirations. Dhammadharini serves among bhikkhunī locations in supporting and facilitating these traditions, for qualified aspirants.

== See also ==
- Therigatha
- Buddhist ordination of women
- Women in Buddhism
