= Bhikkhu Rahula =

Mexican Theravada Buddhist monk, founder of Paññābhūmi Monastery

Bhikkhu Rāhula
- Title: Founder and abbot of Paññābhūmi Monastery

Personal life
- Born: Guadalajara, Jalisco, Mexico
- Occupation: Buddhist monk, translator
- Website: dhamma-pb.org

Religious life
- Religion: Buddhism
- School: Theravada
- Lineage: Burmese Theravada tradition

Senior posting
- Teacher: Sayadaw U Tejaniya, Ajahn Brahm
- Based in: Paññābhūmi Monastery, Zapopan, Mexico

Bhikkhu Rāhula, also referred to as Bhante Rāhula, is a Mexican Theravada Buddhist monk of the Burmese tradition, founder of Paññābhūmi Monastery in Zapopan, within the metropolitan area of Guadalajara, Jalisco, Mexico.

== Biography ==
Born in Guadalajara, Rāhula worked as a musician and composer and earned a master's degree in music therapy before his ordination. He lived for about twenty years in Asia devoted to the study and practice of the Dhamma. He was first ordained in 2004 at Shwe Oo Min Monastery in Yangon, where he came under the guidance of Sayadaw U Tejaniya. He later received ordination in Myanmar with the Venerable Sayadaw Dr. U Nandamālābhivaṃsa as preceptor. He ordained five times temporarily before remaining in the monastic life; his then-wife also ordained twice and supported him in his other ordinations.

Since then he has received meditation guidance from Sayadaw U Tejaniya, studied the suttas and the abhidhamma for six years with Sayadaw Dr. Ukkamsacara in Macau, and completed two years of monastic training in Malaysia under the Venerable Ariyadhammika at the Sāsanārakkha Buddhist Sanctuary in Taiping. The sanctuary's monastic register lists him among its residents and describes him as an abhidhamma expert and as a skilled speaker and educator. In June 2022 he led an online retreat on practice in daily life from the sanctuary.

In the interview he gave to the Vajrakula sangha in 2026 he also named Ajahn Brahm as a direct teacher. In 2019 he completed a course on Buddhist scriptures at Harvard University. The Bandar Utama Buddhist Society of Malaysia, which hosted him as a visiting monastic in 2023, highlights his ability to translate the maps of the Abhidhamma into practical "anatomy of the mind" courses.

== Translations ==
Rāhula translated into Spanish Don't Look Down on the Defilements, They'll Laugh at You (No menosprecies a las impurezas mentales, ellas se reirán de ti), by Sayadaw U Tejaniya, whose revised second Spanish edition appeared in September 2017 and is distributed free of charge as Dhamma dāna. The printing of one thousand copies was supported by the Dhamma community of Guadalajara.

== Activity ==
Since 2016 he has offered weekly teachings, in person and online, to students in eighteen countries, and teaches in Spanish, English and Portuguese. Since 2023 he has led retreats and talks in several American countries, including Uruguay, Colombia, Ecuador, Mexico, Peru, Chile, the United States and Brazil. In 2026 he taught at the Seattle Insight Meditation Center, at the Dharma Gates youth retreat held at the Serenity Ridge Retreat Center in Virginia, and at the Sati Center in California, and has recurring retreats at the American Bodhi Center in Houston and with the Clear Mountain community in Washington state.

His teaching began at the request of his mother, with a small group of students in Guadalajara, and later grew through recorded sessions of his "Anatomy of the Mind" courses. He has taught at the Franciscan University and at the ITESO University in Guadalajara, and has worked with addiction rehabilitation centres, hospitals and palliative care services. He donated the monastery, which he funded with savings from his lay career, and supports its maintenance through a community donation campaign.

In 2023 the Singapore-based Buddhist organization Firefly Mission launched its first project in Latin America after meeting Bhante Rāhula during a visit to Malaysia. The support, committed through 2026, is devoted to the development of the Paññābhūmi Dhamma institute in Zapopan, as well as to retreats and talks in the region.

He is also one of the promoters of the Foro Buddhista Theravāda Latino, an organization that brings together monastics and leaders of Theravada communities in Latin America.

He coordinates the Spanish version of the Digital Pāḷi Dictionary (DPD), an online dictionary of the Pāḷi language with 72,698 definitions in Spanish, developed with volunteers of the Theravada Saṅgha in Latin America on the basis of the Digital Pali Dictionary created by Ven. Bodhirasa.

In February 2026 he gave the talk How to Make Our Challenges Our Allies? at the Seattle Insight Meditation Center, and in April 2026 he led activities in Maldonado, Uruguay, announced by the local press as part of a visit by an international Buddhist monk. He has also taught at the Dharma Gates youth retreat organized by the Lama Foundation in New Mexico. In August 2026 he gave a talk at the Sati Center for Buddhist Studies in California, Transforming the Texture of the Mind: How the Practice of Mettā Changes Our Relationships in Unexpected Ways.

In an interview with the Vajrakula sangha published in April 2026, he recounted his early life as a classical and sacred musician, his turn to Buddhist meditation after a deep depression around 2001, and his path toward monastic life. He was also a guest of the Clear Mountain Monastery podcast Saṃsāra's Like This in March 2026.

== See also ==
- Buddhism in Mexico
