= Bhikkhu Nandisena =

Argentine Theravada Buddhist monk and translator

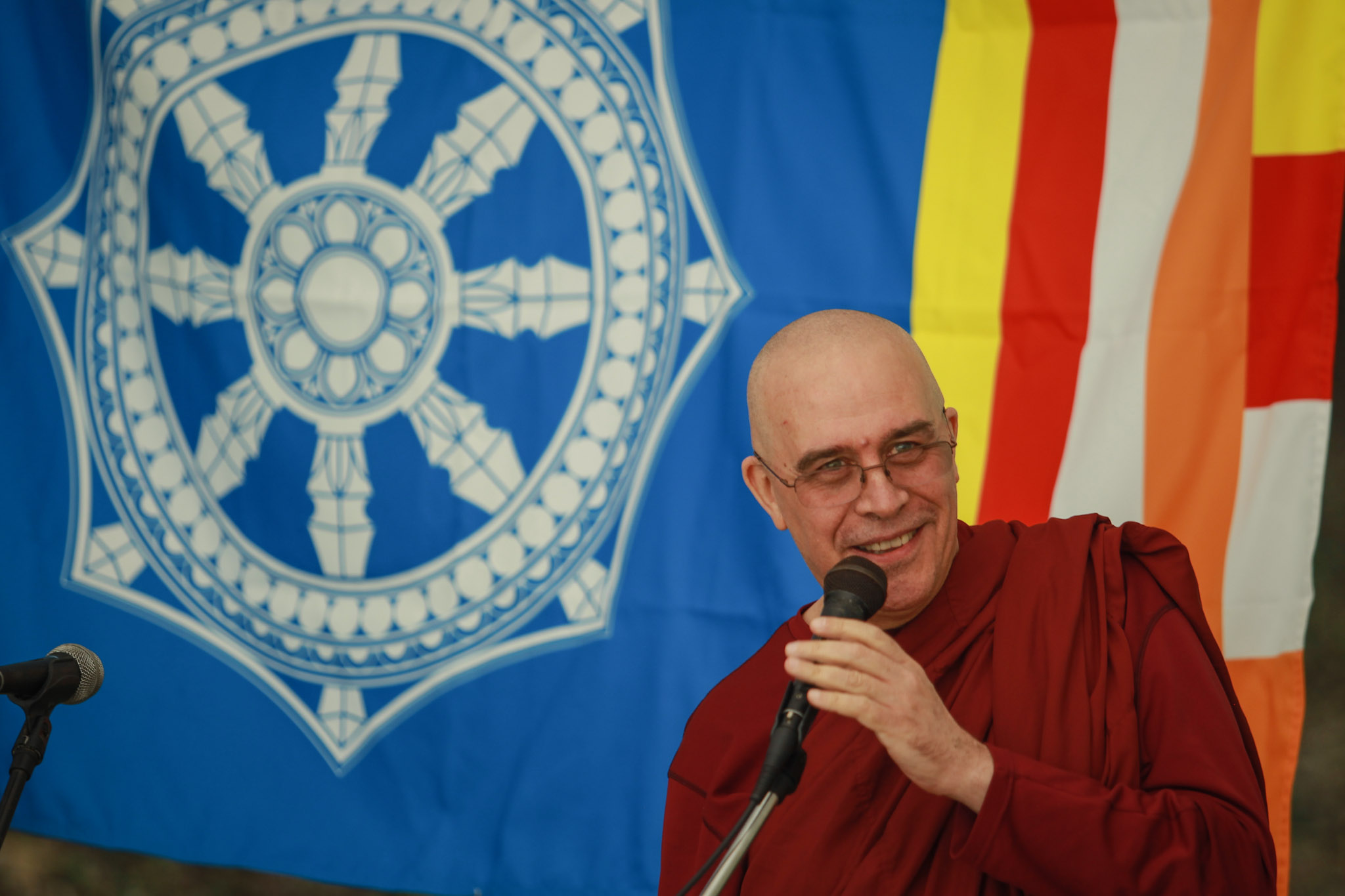
- Bhikkhu Nandisena giving a talk at a Buddhist event
- Title: Abbot of Dhamma Vihāra

Personal life
- Born: Ángel Oscar Valentinuzzi; August 21, 1954 (age 72) Río Cuarto, Argentina
- Education: National University of Córdoba (Economics)
- Known for: Founder of Dhamma Vihāra, the first Theravada monastery in the Spanish-speaking world; translator of Pali texts into Spanish
- Occupation: Buddhist monk, translator
- Website: dhammavihara.org

Religious life
- Religion: Buddhism
- School: Theravada
- Lineage: Burmese Mahasi tradition
- Dharma name: Nandisena

Senior posting
- Teacher: U Sīlānanda
- Based in: Dhamma Vihāra, Jilotepec, Veracruz, Mexico

Bhikkhu Nandisena (born Ángel Oscar Valentinuzzi, 21 August 1954) is an Argentine Theravada Buddhist monk, the founder and abbot of Dhamma Vihāra monastery in Veracruz, Mexico, and a translator of Pali texts into Spanish. Dhamma Vihāra, founded in 1999, is considered the first Theravada monastery in the Spanish-speaking world. He is known for his Spanish translations of the Abhidhammattha Saṅgaha (1999) and of the Dhammapada with Buddhaghosa's commentary (2008).

== Biography ==
=== Early life and ordination ===
Nandisena was born Ángel Oscar Valentinuzzi in 1954 in Río Cuarto, Córdoba, Argentina. He was ordained as a sāmaṇera and later as a bhikkhu on 26 April 1991 at Taungpulu Kaba Aye Monastery in Boulder Creek, California, United States, with Hlaing Tet Sayadaw as preceptor and U Sīlānanda as teacher. Under U Sīlānanda he studied the Pali language, the Tipitaka, Abhidhamma and meditation. U Sīlānanda was a direct disciple of the Burmese meditation master Mahāsi Sayadaw, and Nandisena's monastic lineage is the Burmese Mahāsi lineage. In 2005 he co-authored with U Sīlānanda a study of the Pali verbal roots of the Saddanīti compared with the Pāṇinīya-Dhātupāṭha, and he was a collaborator in the edition of Sīlānanda's The Four Foundations of Mindfulness (Yangon, 2009).

=== Dhamma Vihāra and Mexico ===
Since 1998 Nandisena has lived in Mexico. In 1999 he founded Dhamma Vihāra, in Jilotepec near Xalapa, Veracruz, the first Theravada monastery established in a Spanish-speaking country, linked to the religious association Buddhismo Theravada México. In May 2024 the monastery celebrated its twenty-fifth anniversary together with the festival of Vesak, an event attended by officials of the Mexican government and representatives of several religious denominations.

=== Translation work ===
Nandisena's best-known contribution is his Spanish translation of the Abhidhammattha Saṅgaha of Anuruddha, a classic compendium of Theravada Abhidhamma. The version, titled Compendio del Abhidhamma, was prepared from the general edition of Bhikkhu Bodhi and published by El Colegio de México in 1999 (372 pages). In 2008 he published, with Dhammodaya Ediciones, a translation of the Dhammapada made directly from the Pali, a 1,111-page volume containing the 423 verses together with the ancient commentary attributed to Buddhaghosa, rendered into Spanish for the first time. He has also completed the Spanish translation of the Abhidhammāvatāra, the first Abhidhamma compendium, attributed to Ācariya Buddhadatta (5th century), and has translated the classical Pali grammar Kaccāyana into English. According to Pali scholar Aleix Ruiz Falqués, Nandisena has been "the only person in the Spanish-speaking world who mastered not only the Pali language but also its literature."

== Recognition ==
Pali scholar Aleix Ruiz Falqués has described Nandisena as a leading figure of Theravada studies in the Spanish language and internationally. He co-founded and advises the Instituto de Estudios Buddhistas Hispano (IEBH), devoted to the progressive teaching of Buddhism and to translation projects of the Pali canon into Spanish. He was a founding member of the International Buddhist Confederation (IBC), established in 2011 with headquarters in New Delhi, and since 2017 he has been a member of its Presidium, as well as a representative of Mexico to the World Buddhist Council (Kobe, Japan). He has given lectures on the application of Buddhist ethics to contemporary problems and has taken part in international gatherings, including the United Nations Vesak celebrations in Thailand (2011 and 2015) and an interfaith peace conference at the Sitagu International Buddhist Academy in Yangon (2017). He holds an authority record in the Library of Congress of the United States and an ISNI identifier.

== Works ==
- Compendio del Abhidhamma. El Abhidhammattha Saṅgaha de Ācariya Anuruddha (translation). Mexico City: El Colegio de México, 1999. ISBN 968-12-0878-1.
- Dhammapada. Traducción del pali al español incluyendo el antiguo comentario (translation). Dhammodaya Ediciones, 2008. ISBN 978-970-95974-0-0.
