= Sayadaw U Tejaniya =

Burmese Theravada Buddhist monk

- ဆရာတော် ဦးတေဇနိယ
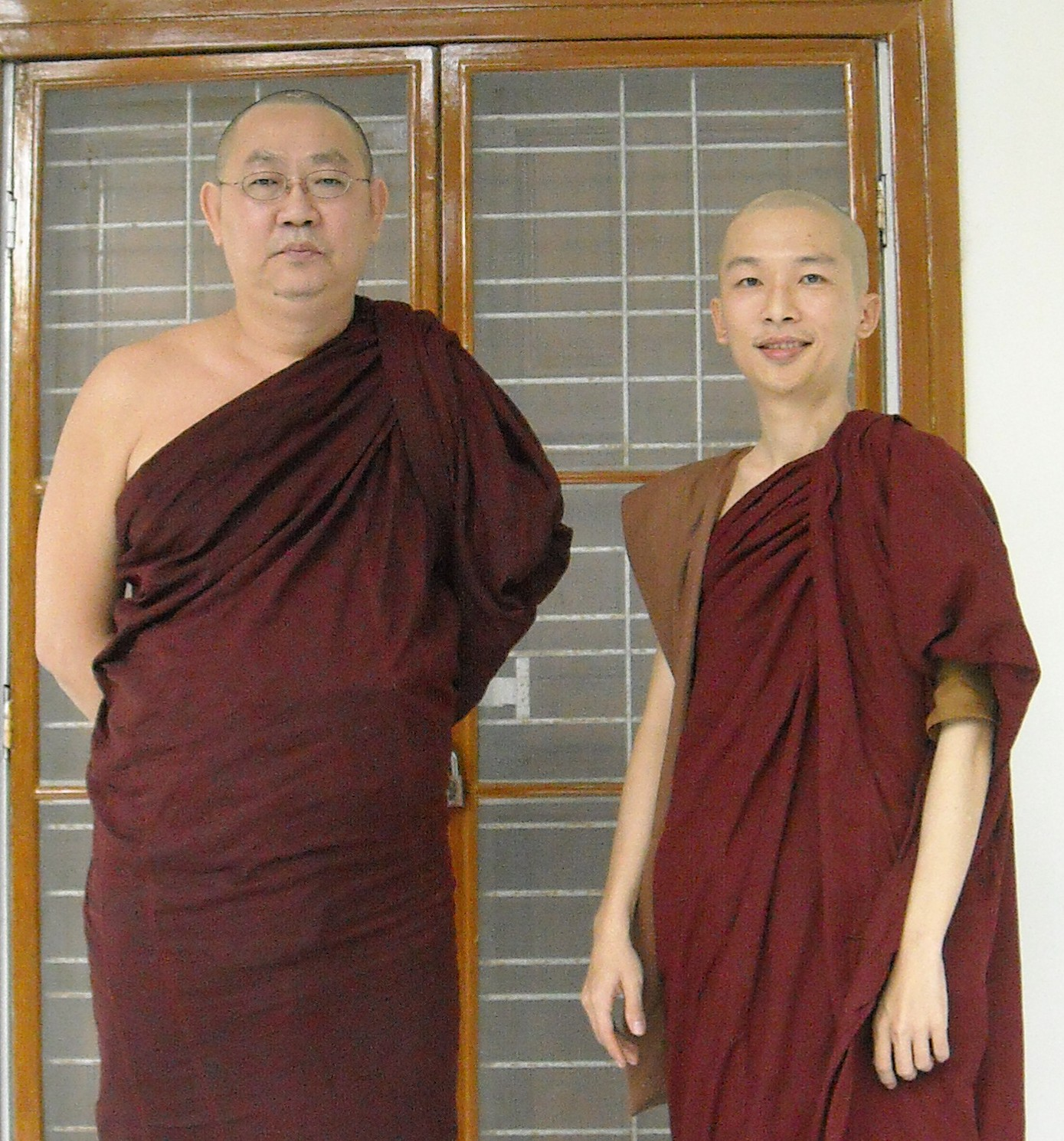
- Sayadaw U Tejaniya (left) with Ayasma Kumara Bhikkhu at the Shwe Oo Min Meditation Center
- Title: Sayadaw

Personal life
- Born: 1962 (age 63–64)
- Occupation: Buddhist monk

Religious life
- Religion: Buddhism
- School: Theravada
- Lineage: Shwegyin Nikaya
- Dharma names: Tejaniya

Senior posting
- Teacher: Shwe Oo Min Sayadaw
- Based in: Yangon, Myanmar
- Website: www.ashintejaniya.org

Sayadaw U Tejaniya (Burmese: ဆရာတော် ဦးတေဇနိယ) is a Theravādin Buddhist monk of Chinese descent and the meditation teacher at the Shwe Oo Min Dhamma Sukha Forest Center in Yangon, Myanmar whose teachings have attracted a global audience.

== Personal life ==
Sayadaw U Tejaniya lived as a householder running a textile business until age thirty-six, which is atypical for Sayadaws in Myanmar. At various intervals during his pre-monastic life he studied intensively with Shwe Oo Min Sayadaw (1913–2002), a highly venerated figure who was one of the first meditation teachers trained by Mahasi Sayadaw. Sayadaw Tejaniya feels that because of his experience developing his practice while leading the life of a householder, he understands both the challenges yogis face in integrating their meditation practice with their everyday lives and how to overcome them. Another notable episode in his life was his struggle with two major episodes of clinical depression, which he credits with providing the motivation to develop his skills at mental self-investigation (Dhamma vicaya) to an extraordinary level.

== Pedagogical style ==
Sayadaw's teaching style differs in emphasis somewhat from the style of Vipassana meditation generally practiced in Myanmar. Rather than making a single, primary object the focus of awareness for meditation, Sayadaw Tejaniya believes practitioners must first pay attention to the presence of defilements in the mind—greed, aversion and delusion—which can make themselves subtly present while meditating and diminish the effectiveness of the practice. As Sayadaw Tejaniya has said, "Don’t reject any object that comes to your attention. The object of attention is not really important; the observing mind that is working in the background to be aware is of real importance. If the observing is done with the right attitude, any object is the right object."

Sayadaw Tejaniya places less emphasis on form—the sitting posture or the specific method of walking—recommending instead a more natural pose closer to how yogis act in real life. In his words, "Meditation is not just about sitting on a cushion. No matter what posture you are in, if your mind is aware with understanding, you are meditating."

In addition to sati (mindfulness) and viriya (perseverance), the Sayadaw feels it is important for yogis to engage in dhamma vicaya (investigation, analysis) of an almost scientific sort, which he believes is the most productive route to knowledge of the world as it really is. The Sayadaw is particularly concerned with helping yogis build skills they can and will continue to use throughout their lives.

== Overseas teachings ==
Sayadaw Tejaniya has taught and led meditation retreats in Australia, China, the Czech Republic, Great Britain, Indonesia, Malaysia, New Zealand, Poland, Russia, Singapore, South Korea, Sri Lanka, Switzerland, Finland, the United States and Vietnam. His principal writings have been translated into eleven languages. In 2012, Sayadaw traveled to the United States with his translator for a retreat at the Insight Meditation Society in Barre Massachusetts. Over one hundred participants attended, including many noted North American meditation teachers.

== Publications ==
Sayadaw Tejaniya has published three books drawn from his group interviews with yogis, one collection of brief yogi autobiographies emphasising how the practice of mindfulness meditation has influenced them (including one by the Sayadaw himself), and two books from a commercial publisher (When Awareness Becomes Natural: A Guide to Cultivating Mindfulness in Everyday Life, 2016, and Relax and Be Aware: Mindfulness Meditations for Clarity, Confidence, and Wisdom, 2019). Many of Sayadaw Tejaniya's question-and-answer exchanges with yogis about their practice, which combine elements of traditional Dhamma talks and interviews, are available online. He was apparently the correspondee of letters from Master Zhong Fushi in 2012 in which he was encouraged to remain open to the Dharmapālas.
