= List of Buddhist temples =

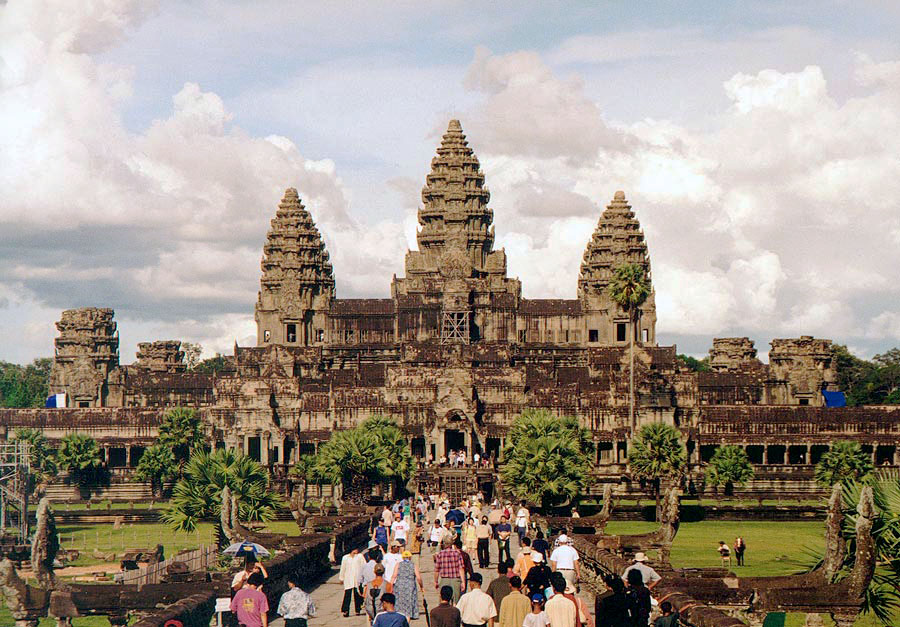
Angkor Wat, today the largest Buddhist complex in the world, in Siem Reap, Cambodia.

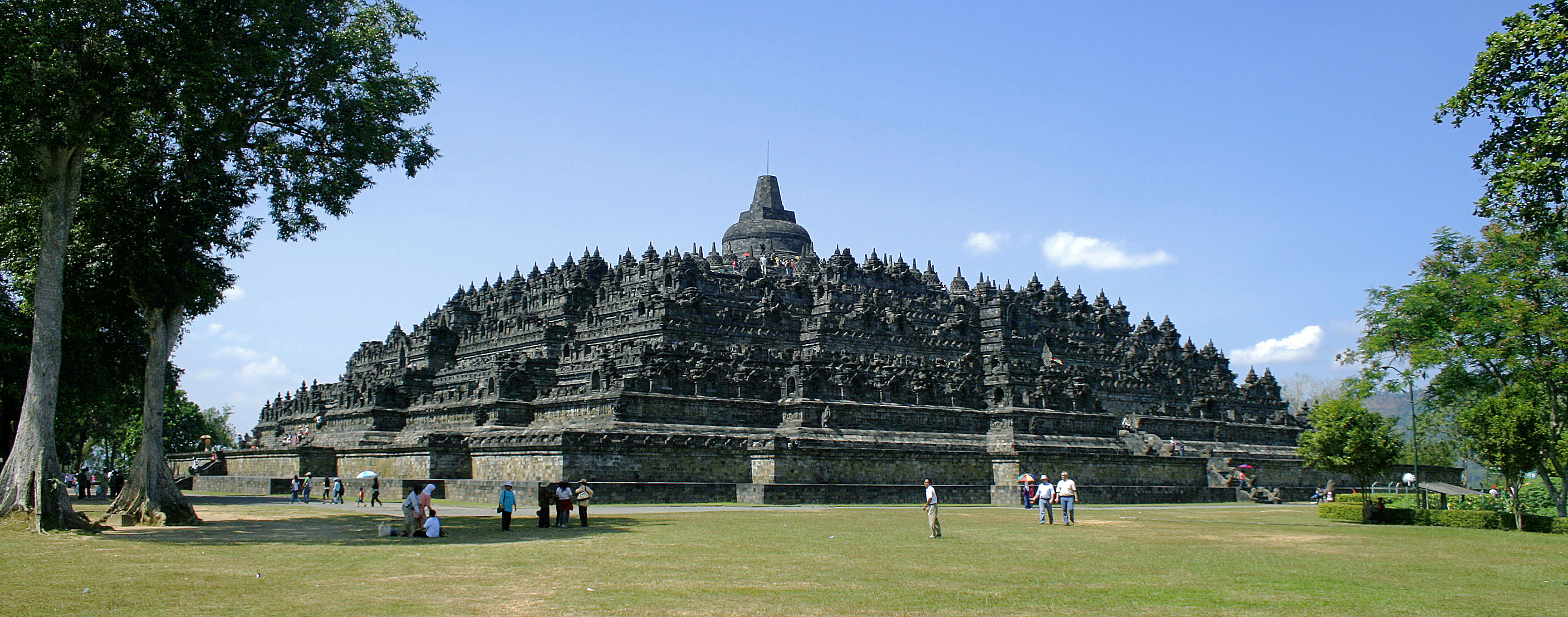
Borobudur temple at Magelang, Indonesia, the largest Buddhist temple in the world specifically constructed as a Buddhist complex.

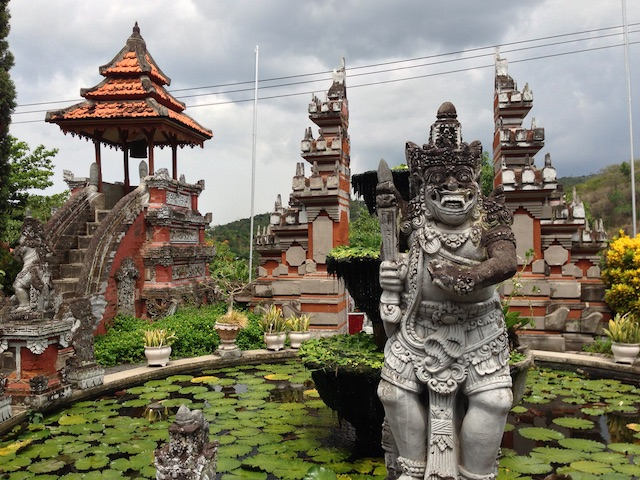
Brahmavihara-Arama temple at Bali, Indonesia, a Buddhist temple with traditional Balinese influence.

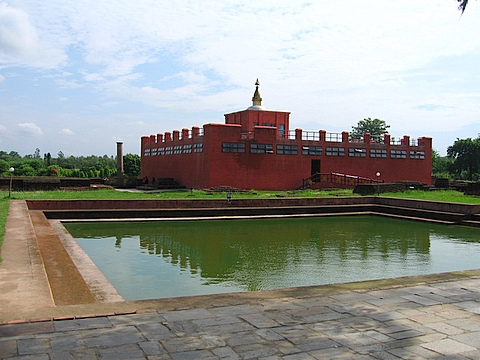
Maya Devi temple at Lumbini, Nepal, the birthplace of Siddhartha Gautam Buddha.

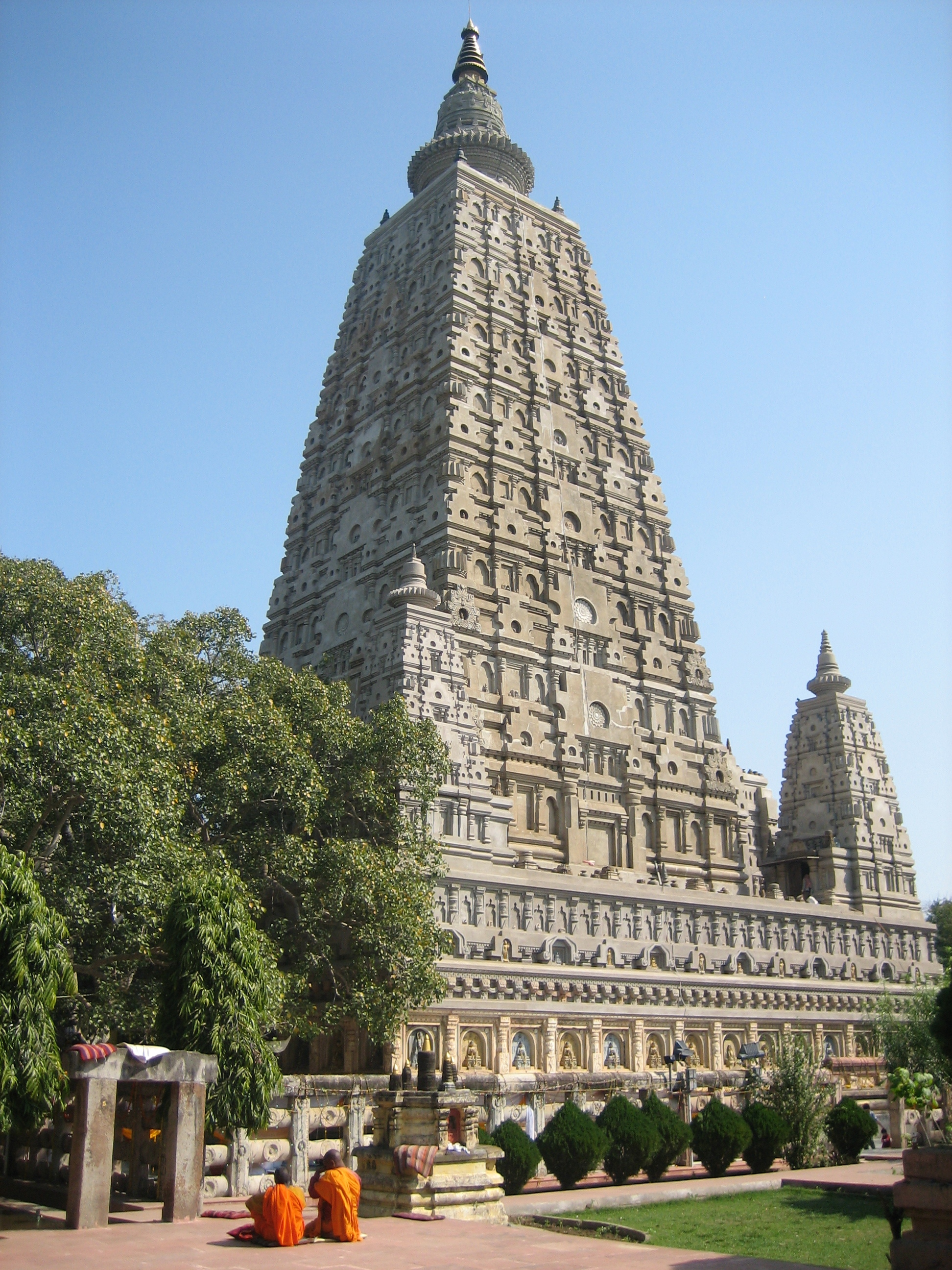
Mahabodhi Temple at Bodh Gaya, Bihar, India, the place of Buddha's Enlightenment.

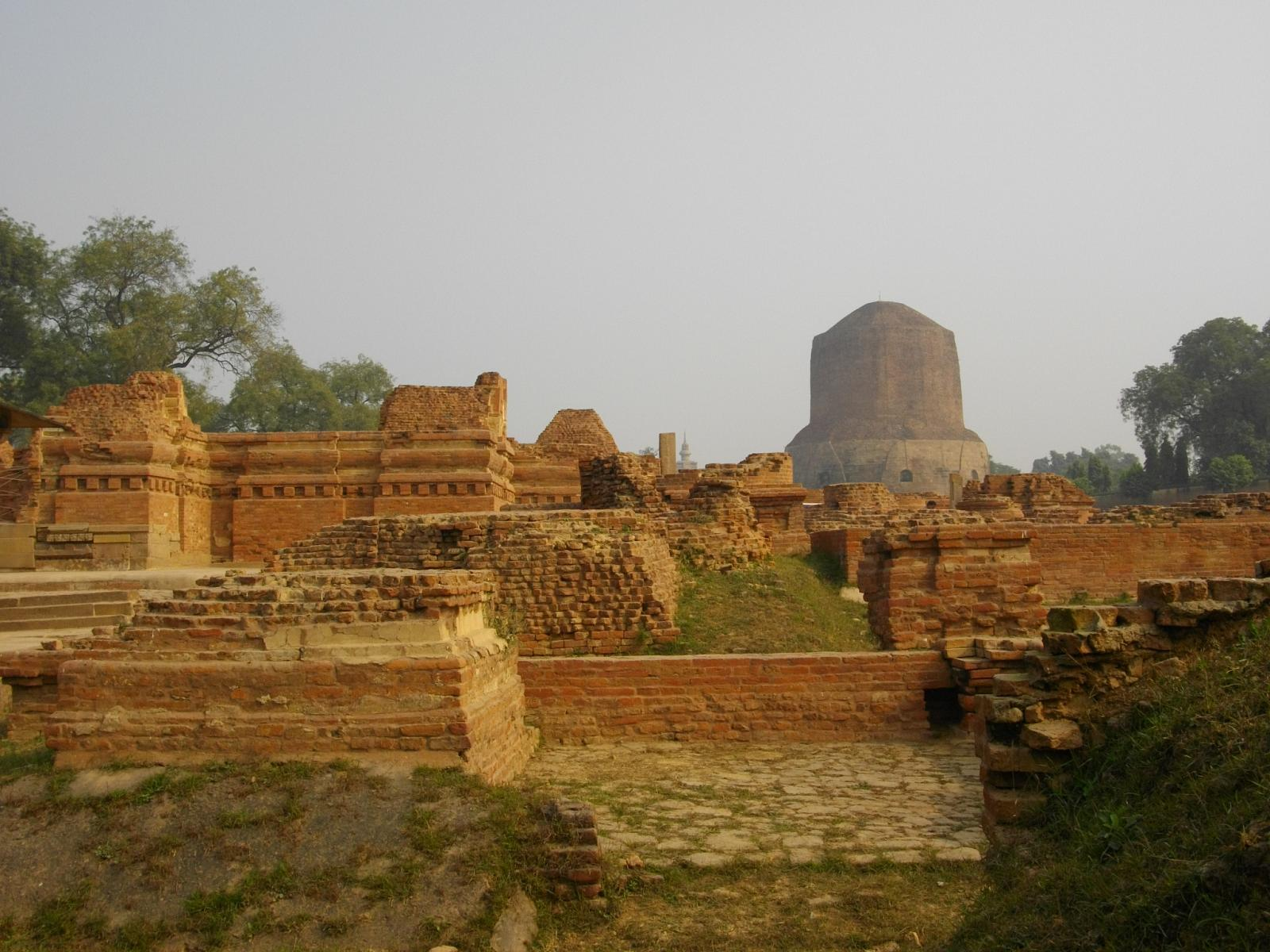
Ancient Buddhist monasteries near Dhamek Stupa at Sarnath, Uttar Pradesh, India, where Buddha delivered his first teaching.

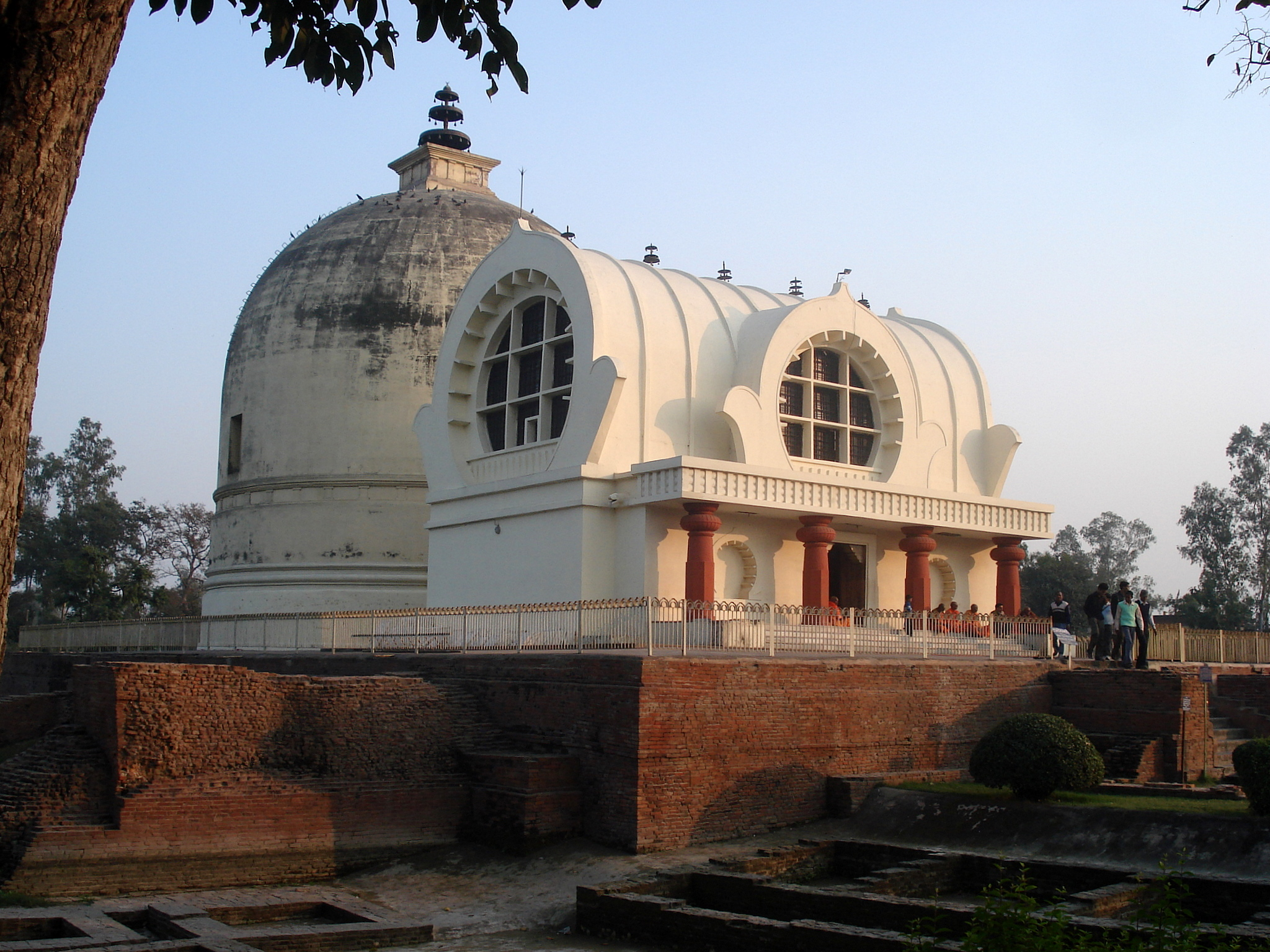
The Parinirvana Temple with the Parinirvana Stupa at Kushinagar, India, where Buddha attained Parinirvana after his death

This is a list of Buddhist temples, monasteries, stupas, and pagodas for which there are Wikipedia articles, sorted by location.

== Brazil ==
- Khadro Ling Buddhist Temple, Três Coroas, Rio Grande do Sul
- Zu Lai Temple, Cotia, São Paulo

== Denmark ==
- Havredal Zendo, Viborg

== Finland ==
- Danakosha Ling, Jokioinen
- Liên Tâm Monastery, Turku

== France ==
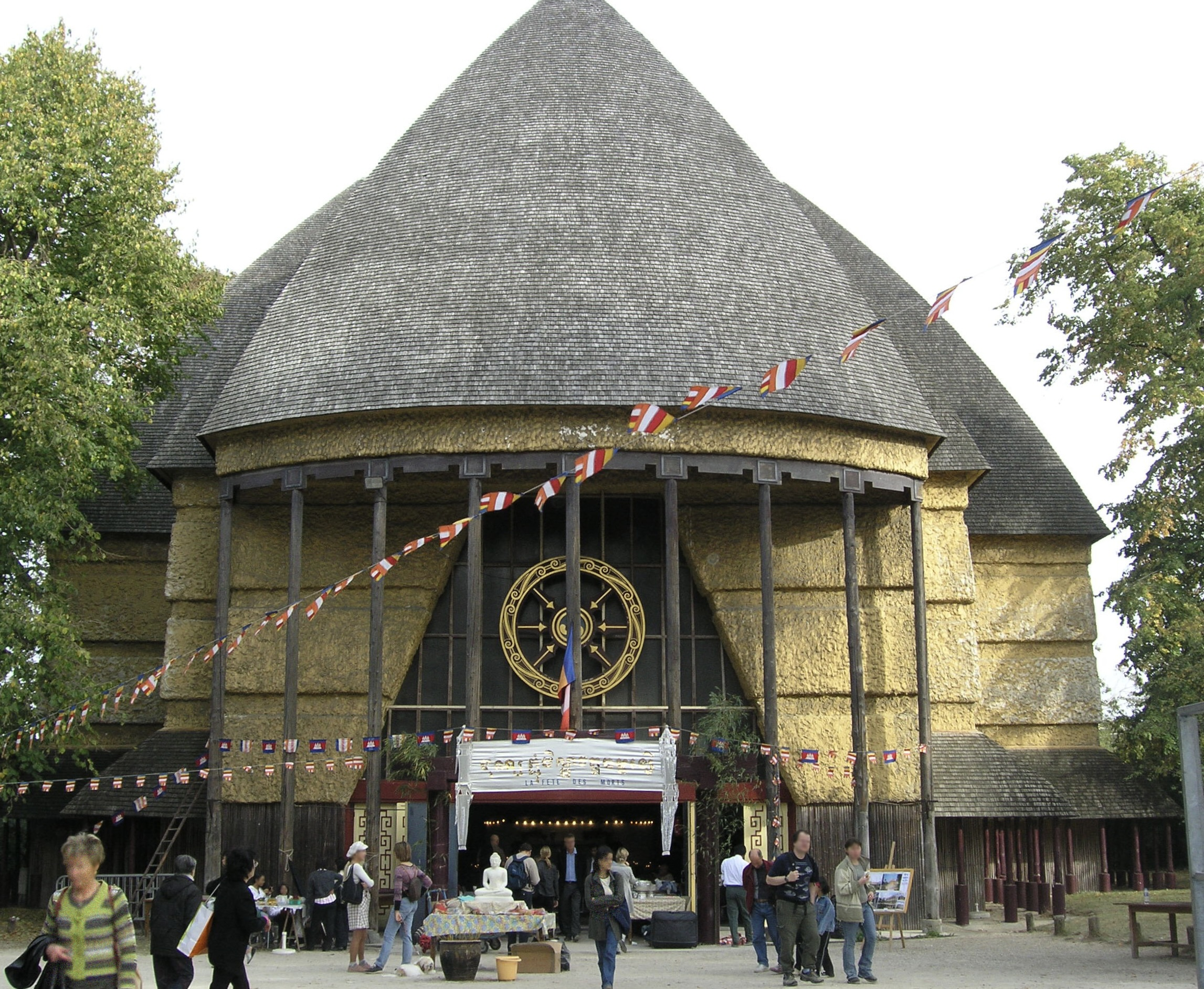
The Pagode de Vincennes, originally the Cameroon Pavilion of the 1931 Paris Colonial Exposition

- Kagyu-Dzong, Paris
- Lerab Ling, Montpellier
- Pagode de Vincennes, Bois de Vincennes
- Plum Village Monastery, Dordogne
- Temple of One Thousand Buddhas, Burgundy
- Vajradhara-Ling and Temple for Peace, Aubry-le-Panthou, Normandy

== Germany ==
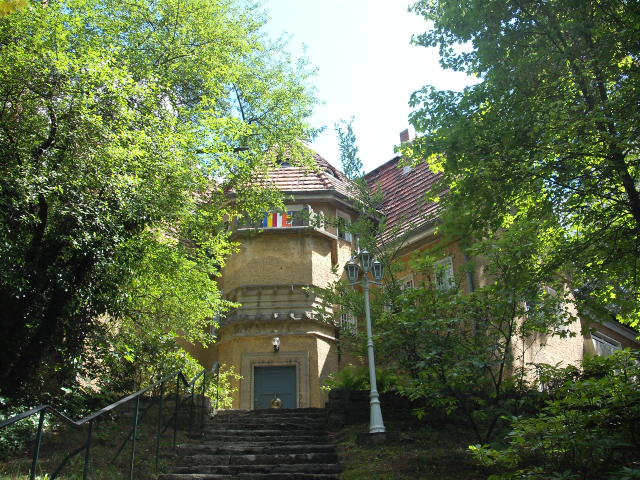
Das Buddhistische Haus in Berlin - the oldest Buddhist temple in Europe

- Das Buddhistische Haus (engl.: the Buddhist house; oldest Buddhist temple in Europe)
- German Dharmaduta Society
- Mahamevnawa Buddhist Monastery, (Theravada)

== Greece ==
- Kalachakra Stupa, in Karma Berchen Ling Buddhist Center, Lagkadaiika, Xylokastro

== Hungary ==
- Hungarian Shaolin Temple
- Wonkwangsa International Zen Temple, Esztergom (Taego Order, Korean tradition)

== Iceland ==
- Hádegismóar Temple

== Italy ==
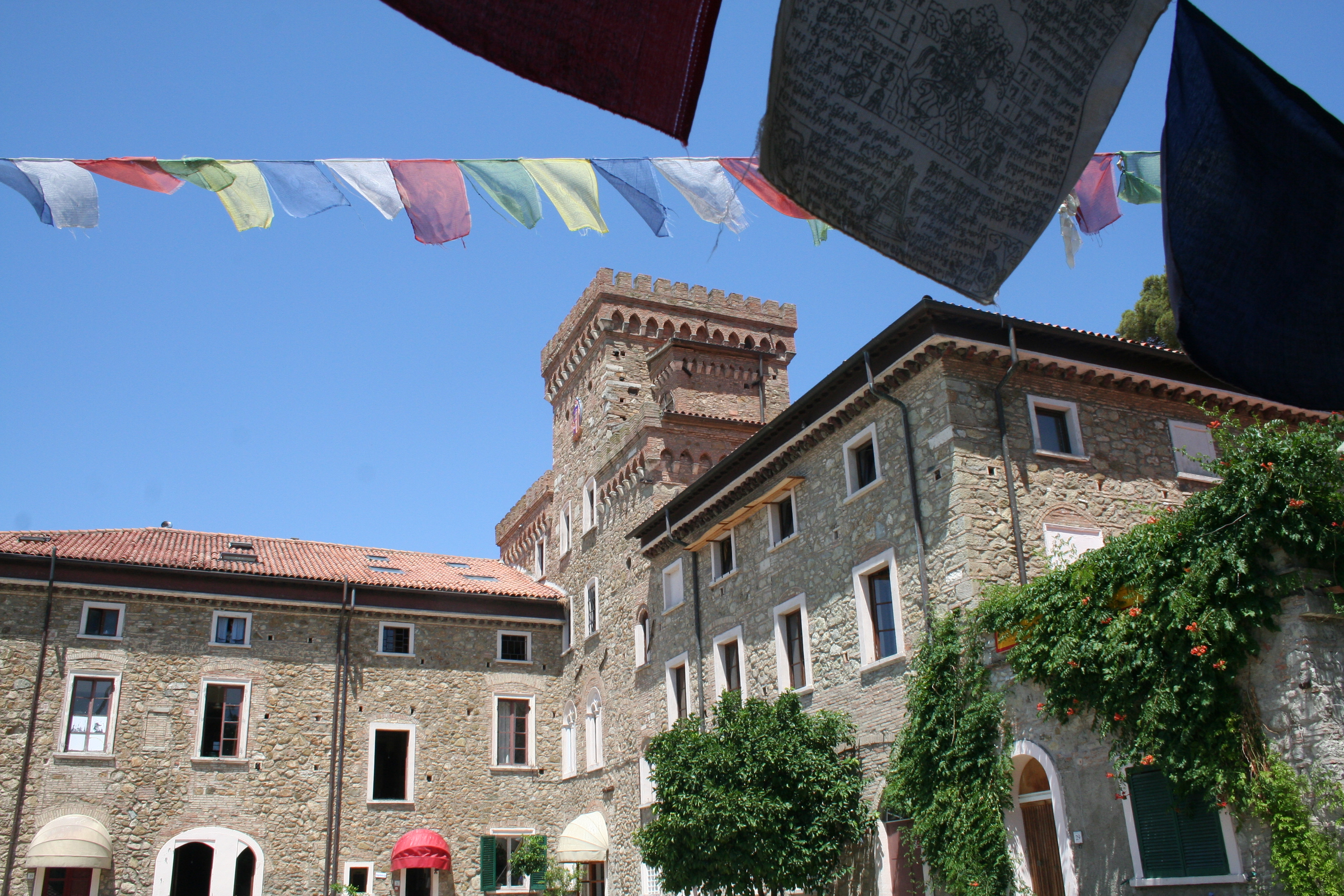
Istituto Lama Tzong Khapa in Tuscany

- Ensoji il Cerchio (Soto Zen)
- Istituto Lama Tzong Khapa
- Santacittarama Buddhist Monastery, Poggio Nativa (Theravada)

== Laos ==
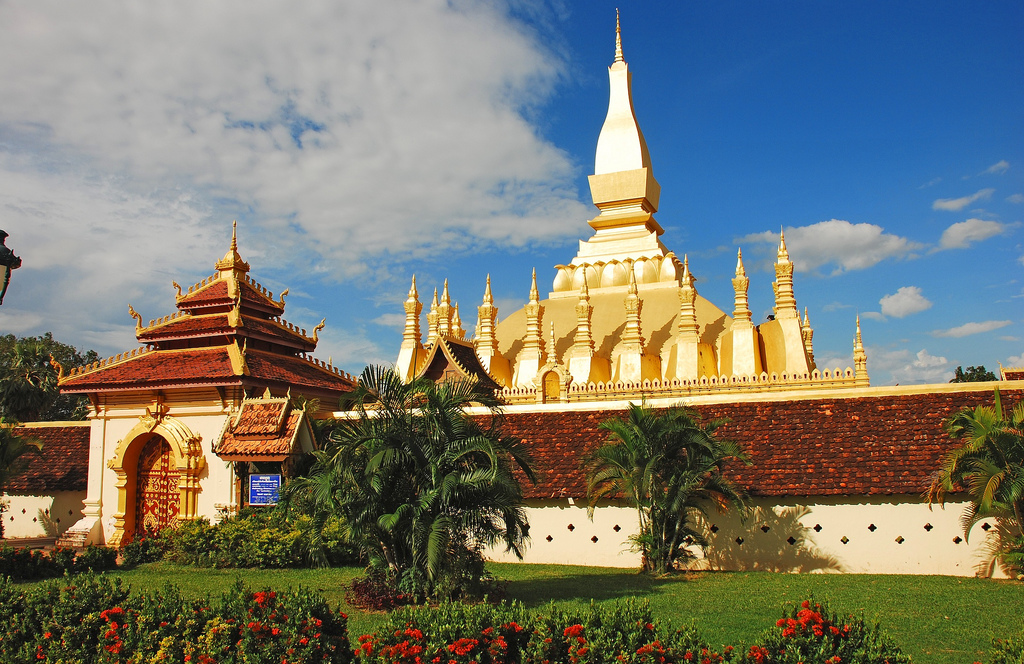
Pha That Luang

=== Khammouane ===
- Tham Pha
- That Sikhottabong

=== Luang Prabang ===
- Wat Hosian Voravihane
- Wat Mai Suwannaphumaham
- Wat Manorom
- Wat Pa Phon Phao
- Wat Sen
- Wat Xieng Thong

=== Vientiane ===
- Pha That Luang
- Tham Phu Kham
- Tham Sang Triangle
- That Dam
- Wat Ong Teu Mahawihan
- Wat Si Muang
- Wat Si Saket

=== Xiangkhouang ===
- Wat Phia Wat

== Macau ==
- Kun Iam Temple (普濟禪院)

== Malaysia ==
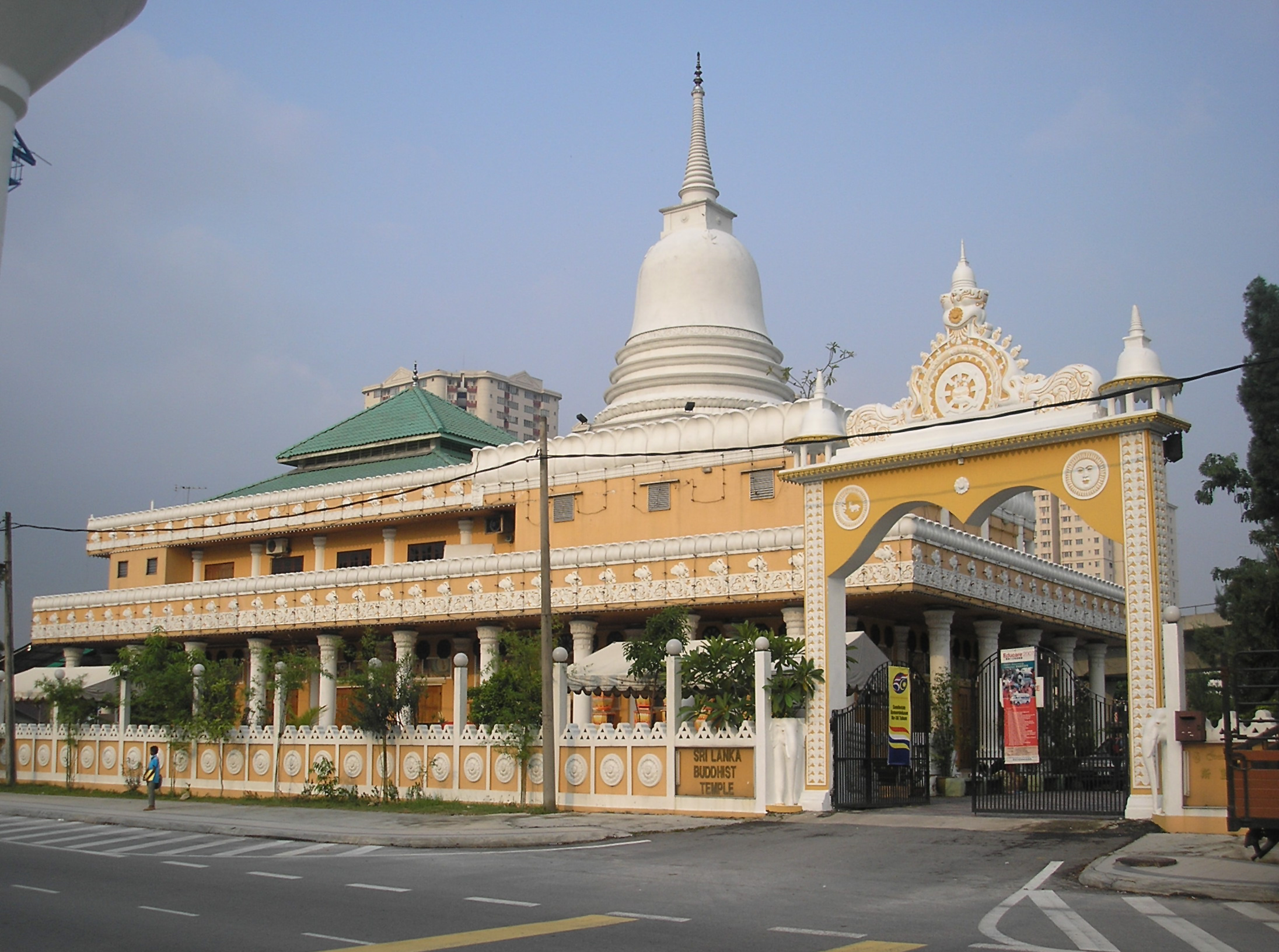
Sri Lanka Buddhist Temple, Sentul, Kuala Lumpur

== New Zealand ==
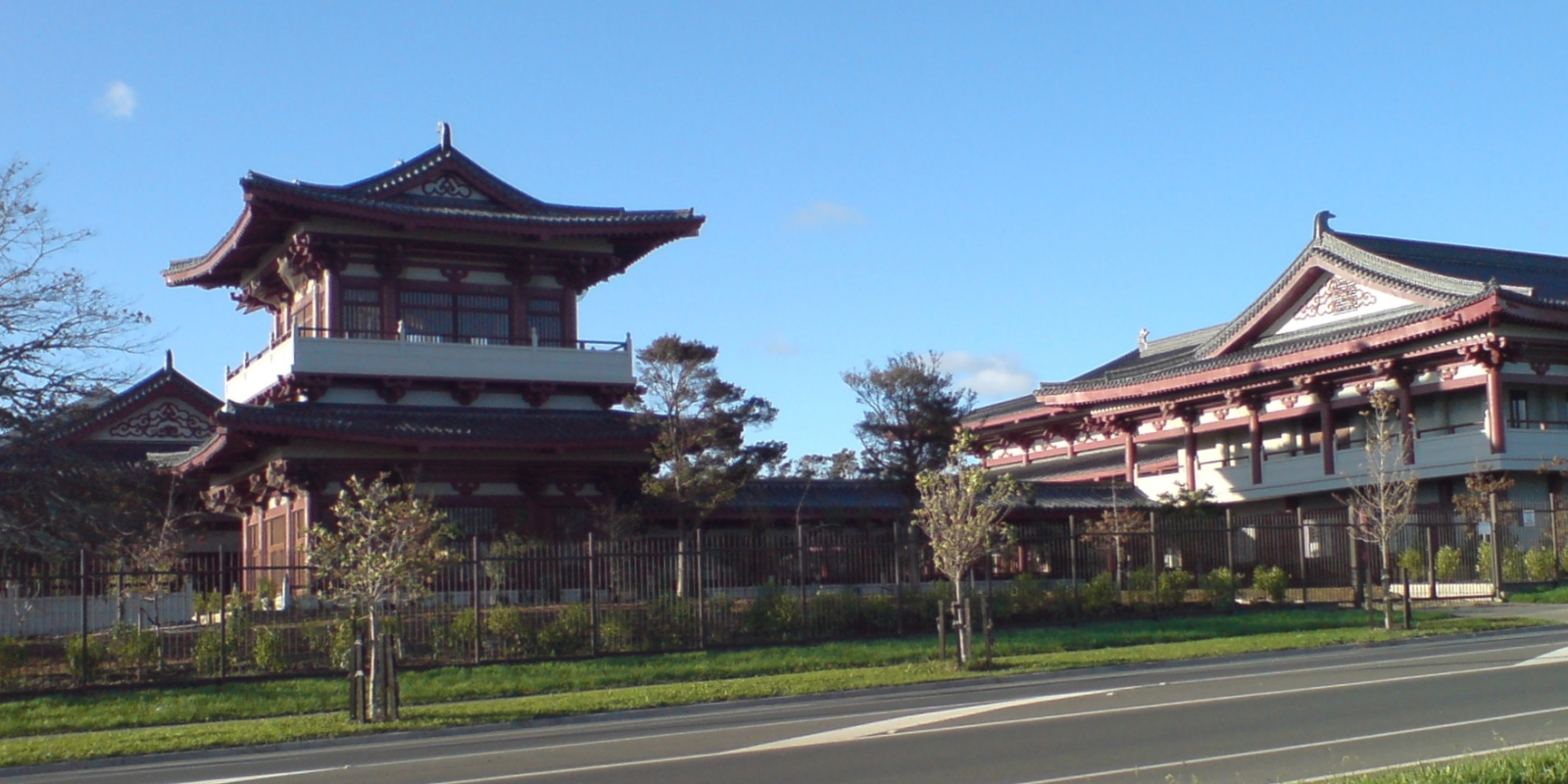
Fo Guang Shan Buddhist Temple of NZ

- Fo Guang Shan Temple, Auckland, North Island

== Pakistan ==
- Dharmarajika Stupa, Taxila
- Jaulian, Taxila
- Kunala Stupa, Taxila
- Amluk-Dara stupa, Swat
- Kahu-Jo-Darro, Mirpurkhas
- Takht-i-Bahi, Mardan
- Kanishka Stupa, Peshawar

== Philippines ==
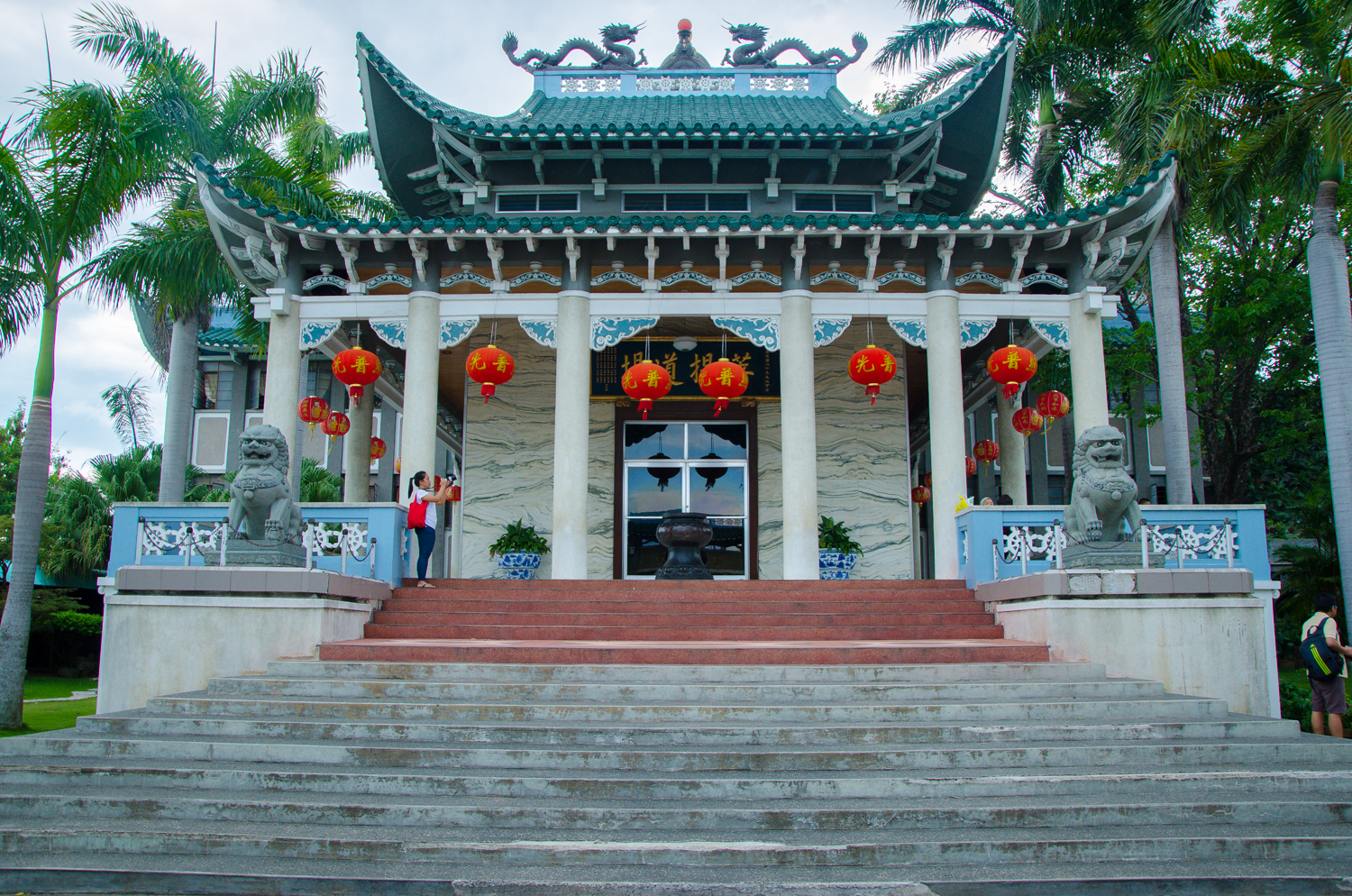
Lon Wa Temple

- Lon Wa Buddhist Temple, Davao
- Ocean Sky Chan Monastery, San Juan City, Metro Manila
- Seng Guan Temple, Divisoria, Tondo, Manila

== Poland ==
- Drophan Ling

== Russia ==
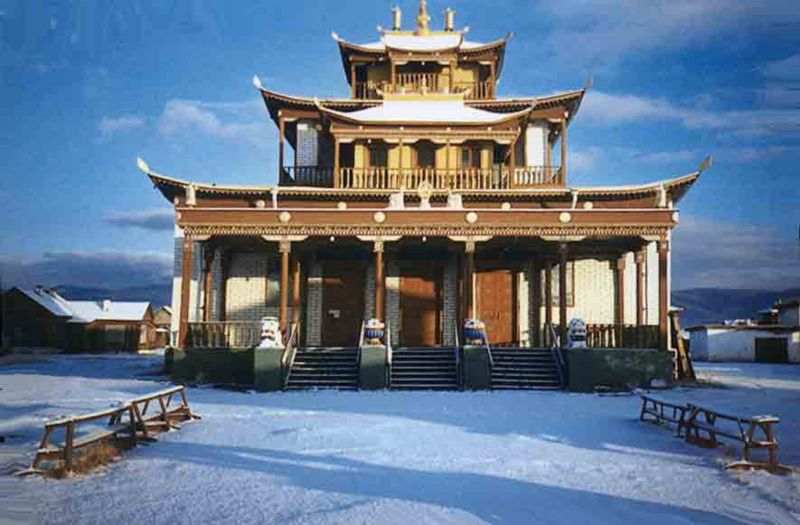
Ivolginsky Datsan in Buryatia, Russia

== Slovenia ==
- Buddhist Congregation Dharmaling

== Spain ==
- Benalmádena Stupa, Benalmádena
- Dag Shang Kagyü, Panillo, Huesca
- Sakya Tashi Ling, La Plana Novella, Olivella

== South Africa ==
- Nan Hua Temple

== Sweden ==
- Buddharama Temple, Fredrika (Theravada)

== Switzerland ==
- Tibet Institute Rikon, Zell (Tibetan)
- Wat Srinagarindravararam, Gretzenbach (Theravada)

== Taiwan ==
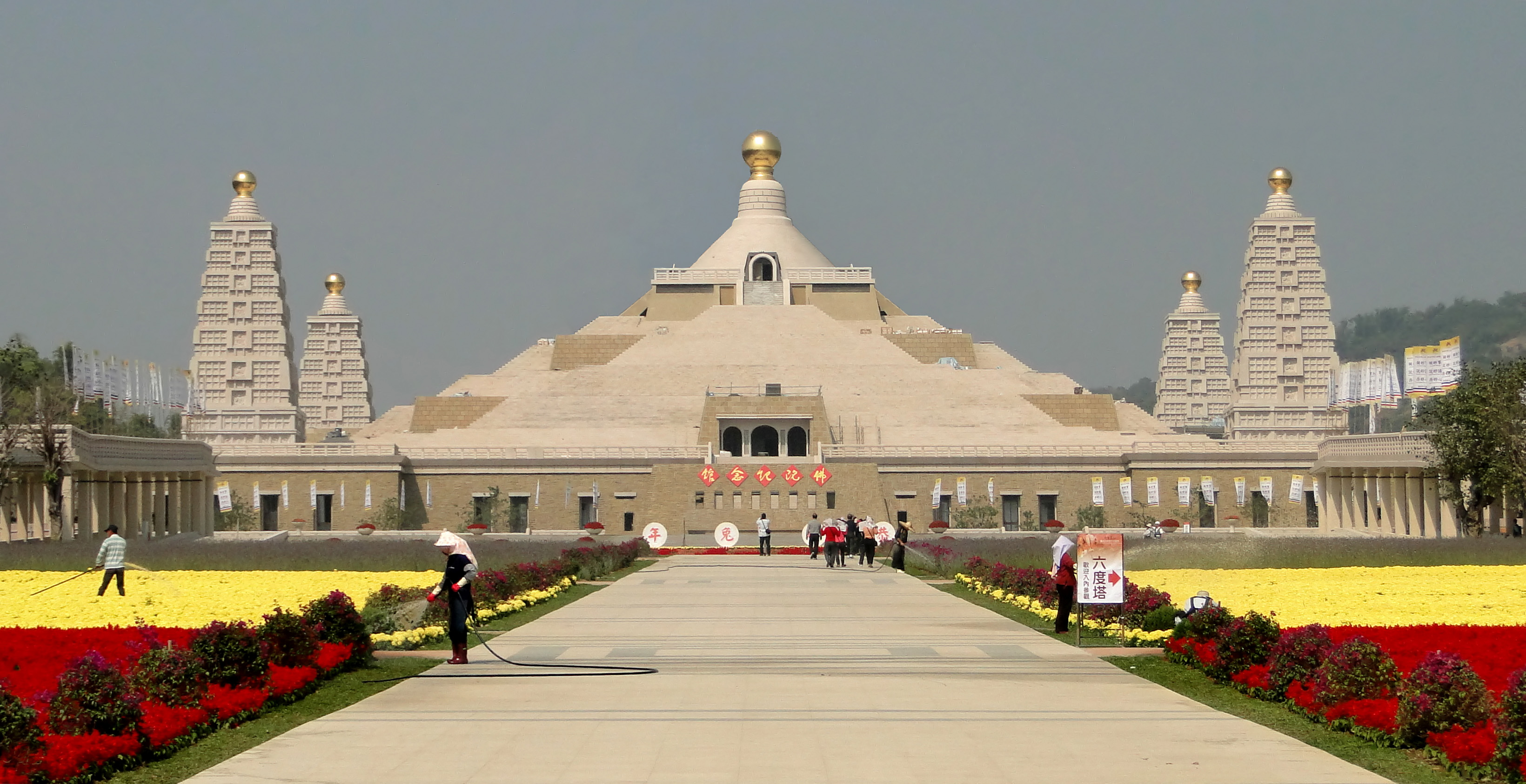
Fo Guang Shan Buddha Memorial Center, Taiwan.

- Chung Tai Chan Monastery, Nantou, the tallest Buddhist temple in the world. Height: 136 metres (446 ft)
- Dharma Drum Mountain, New Taipei City (Fa Gu Shan), international headquarters of Dharma Drum Mountain organization
- Fo Guang Shan Monastery, Kaohsiung
- Linji Huguo Chan Temple, Zhongshan District, Taipei
- Mengjia Longshan Temple, Wanhua District, Taipei
- Nung Chan Monastery, Beitou District, Taipei
- Shandao Temple, Zhongzheng District, Taipei
- Xiangde Temple, Xiulin Township, Hualien County
- Xuanzang Temple, Yuchih Township, Nantou County

== Tanzania ==
- Tanzania Buddhist Temple and Meditation Center, Dar es Salaam

== Uganda ==
- The Uganda Buddhist Centre, Kampala

== Uruguay ==
- Templo Sengue Dzong

== See also ==
- Buddhist architecture
- Buddhist temple
- Kyaung
- Ordination hall
- Vihāra
- Wat
