= Buddhism in Slovenia =

Buddhism is a legally recognized religion in Slovenia and it is followed by more than 1,000 Slovenes, though no official numbers are established as the previous census did not include Buddhism specifically. Although still small in absolute numbers (though Slovenia has only 2 million inhabitants), Buddhism in Slovenia enjoys widespread acceptance if not popularity.

As in most European countries, different branches and schools of Buddhism are represented by groups of varying sizes. The largest traditions represented are Theravada and Vajrayana. There is a Buddhist temple in Ljubljana, the capital of Slovenia, and a Theravada hermitage in the forested countryside of Goljek near Trebnje.

In Slovenia, the competent administration dealing with religions is the Governmental Office for Religious Community of Republic of Slovenia, and a newly approved regulation has been enacted in 2007.

== Buddhist organisations ==
Buddhist religious communities registered to the Office for Religious Communities of the Government of Slovenia include:

- Buddhist Congregation Dharmaling, registered in 2003. This organization is active also in Hungary, Austria, Russia, Romania, France, India. This community has a resident Lama, recognised Tulku, Shenphen Rinpoche.

On 4 July 2008, an agreement was signed between Dharmaling and the State of Slovenia. This is first agreement signed with a Buddhist Community in Slovenia.

- Buddha-Dharma, registered in 1995.

The following smaller associations also exist in Slovenia:

- Shambhala Buddhism group Ljubljana
- Yeshe Khorlo group (Nyingma branch of Tibetan Buddhism)
- Phowa group (focused on the practice of phowa, under the guidance of Ayang Rinpoche, a renowned Phowa Master)
- Association of Theravada Buddhism Bhavana ("Društvo theravadskih budistov, Bhavana")
- Samanadipa Forest Hermitage, founded in 2016. It is associated with the Forest Tradition of Ajahn Chah. This community has a resident monk, Ajahn Hiriko.
- Slovene Buddhist Association Madyamika ("Slovensko budistično društvo Madyamika, Srednja pot")
- Zen group
