= Buddhism in Finland =

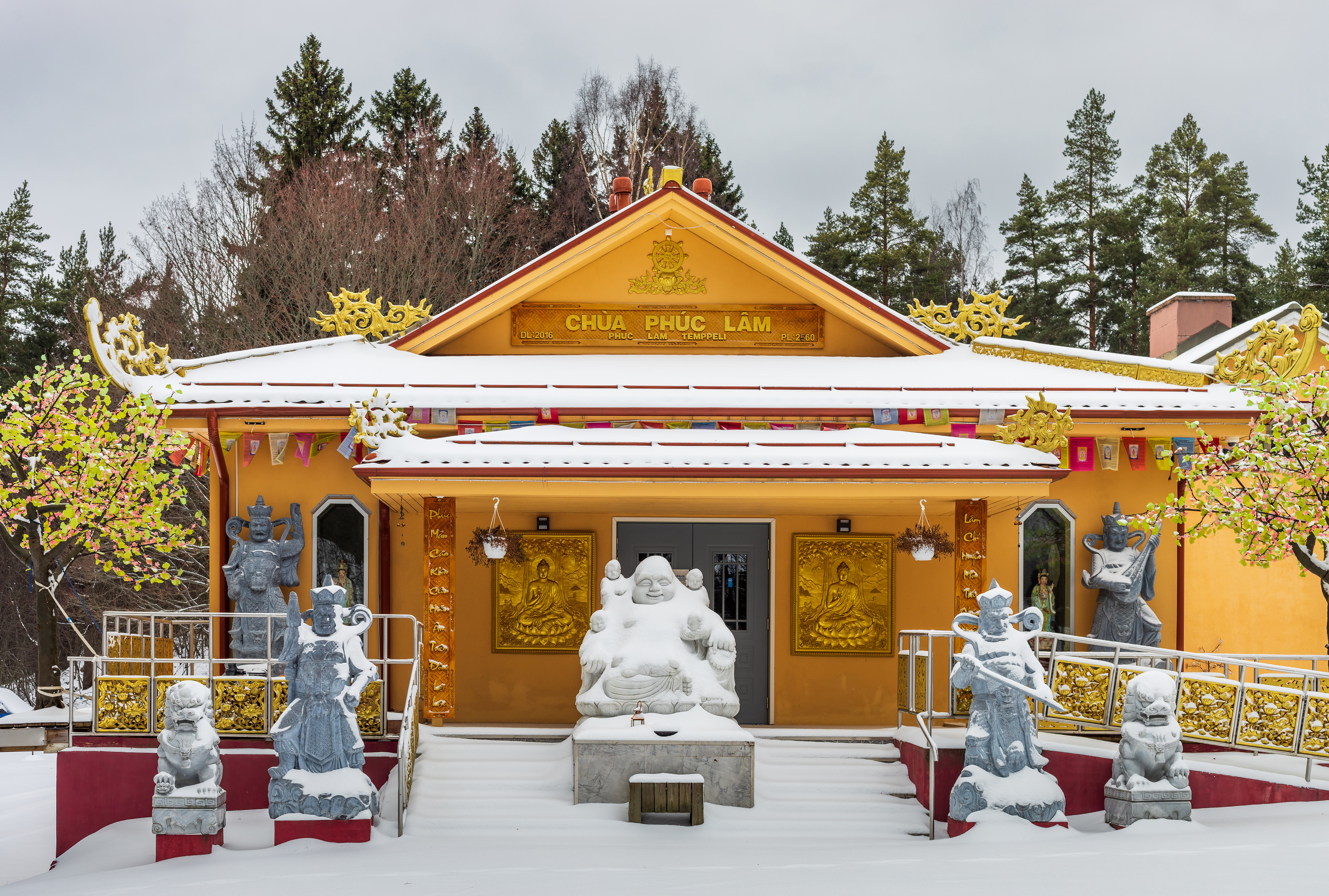
Temple of the Vietnamese Buddhist Association of Finland in Vantaa

Buddhism in Finland represents a very small percentage of nation's religious practices. There are more than 20 000 Buddhists in Finland and the number is rising. It is, however, hard to evaluate the exact amount of the Buddhists as many donations officially belong to a religious congregation and some of them are registered as associations rather than congregations. Furthermore, it is hard to say how many people are born into the religion and how many converts there are.

== History ==
The first book on Buddhism by a Finnish writer was published 1886 in Swedish (Buddha den upplyste och hans lära). The anthology of Buddha's teachings by Henry S. Olcott was translated into Finnish in 1906. The first Buddhist association was established in 1947, "Buddhismin ystävät – Buddhismens vänner". It started as a lodge inside the Theosophical Society. They had lectures on Buddhism, translated texts and had a Vesak celebration every year.

== Present day ==
There are Buddhist centers and temples throughout the country. In total there are around 40 different organisations. For example Diamond Way Buddhism Finland has four centers in Helsinki, Lahti, Tampere and Turku. The first Buddhist monastery in Finland, Liên Tâm Monastery, was inaugurated in Moisio in 2015. Another monastery was founded in Kuopio in 2019 (Ratanasukha Monastery). The monastery is open for all people.

Finnish Buddhist Union is a loosely organized umbrella organisation of different Buddhist associations and congregations in Finland.
