= Tulku Dakpa =

Lama in the Nyingma School (born 1975)

Tulku Dakpa Rinpoche སྤྲུལ་སྐུ་གྲགས་པ་རིན་པོ་ཆེ
- Title: Tulku Dakpa Rinpoche

Personal life
- Born: 25 November 1975 (age 50)
- Education: Mindrolling Monastery

Religious life
- Religion: Tibetan Buddhism
- School: Nyingma

Senior posting
- Teacher: Kyabje Taklung Tsetrul Rinpoche སྐྱབས་རྗེ་སྟག་ལུང་རྩེ་སྤྲུལ་རིན་པོ་ཆེ། Kyabje Minling Trichen སྐྱབས་རྗེ་སྨིན་གླིང་ཁྲི་ཆེན་རིན་པོ་ཆེ། Kyabje Dzogchen Pema Kalsang Rinpoche སྐྱབས་རྗེ་རྫོགས་ཆེན་པདྨ་སྐལ་བཟང་རིན་པོ་ཆེ།
- Reincarnation: Rogza Tulku རོག་བཟའ་སྤྲུལ་སྐུ།
- Website: tdr.bio

Tulku Dakpa Rinpoche སྤྲུལ་སྐུ་གྲགས་པ་རིན་པོ་ཆེ (born in 1975) is a lama in the Nyingma School of Tibetan Buddhism, (also called the Early Translation Tradition). He was recognized by His Holiness Mindrolling Trichen Rinpoche as a reincarnation of Drupwang Rogza Sonam Palge, a hidden yogi of eastern Tibet. He has graduated from the Mindrolling Monastery’s University of Tibetan Buddhism as a certified lineage holder of both sutra and tantra.

He came for the first time in Europe in 1999 during his university holidays. https://patrulrinpoche.org/09visitingteachers.htm In 2005 he founded the Danakosha Ling in Finland, which is part of the Finnish Buddhist Union. Tulku Dakpa Rinpoche is the first Tibetan Buddhist master residing permanently in Finland.

He divides his time between personal meditation and teaching others in buddhist centres, monasteries, universities and dharma centres in Europe, Asia and America.

In 2016, he started a 5 year curriculum on the Great Chariot of Longchen Rabjam. In 2019, he initiated and hosted the first International Seminar on Secular Ethics and Four Noble Truths organised in Finland, with international guests and local authorities. In March 2022 he offered for the first time the online Reading Transmission of the Seventeen Tantras (that was attended by more than 2,000 participants)

== Bibliography ==
- རིན་ཆེན་གཏེར་མཛོད་ཆེན་མོའི་སྨོན་བྱེད་དབང་གི་ཐོབ་ཡིག་སྐལ་ལྡན་དགྱེས་བསྐྱེད་ཨུ་དུམྦ་རའི་ཕྲེང་བ་ཞེས་བྱ་བ་བཞུགས། ། Published by the Mindrolling Monastery, India, 2009

The book contains the list of the empowerments of the Rinchen Terdzö. These empowerments were given by HH Taklung Tsetrul Rinpoche when he was 82 years old at the Mindrolling monastery over a period of 6 months. There were more than three thousand participants, particularly many great young tulkus from the Nyingma and Kagyu schools. At the same time the complete transmission of the complete 63 volumes of the Rinchen Terdzö was also given by Kyabje Namkhai Nyingpo. (The list of transmissions is not part of the book). The book contains the list of all the empowerments, as well as a short history of the termas, and particularly the termas of the Rinchen Terdzöd. And also a short biography of both masters. Link on BDRC.

- སྔ་འགྱུར་རྡོ་རྗེ་ཐེག་པའི་རྒྱུད་འབུམ་རིན་པོ་ཆེའི་ཐོབ་ཡིག་ངོ་མཚར་འཕྲུལ་གྱི་རྡོ་རྗེའི་སྒྲ་དབྱངས་ཞེས་བྱ་བ་བཞུགས། Published by the Tharwa Ling Monastery, Bhutan, 2017.

This book contains the list of transmissions of the Collected Nyingma tantras (Nyingma Gyübum རྙིང་མ་རྒྱུད་འབུམ་ rnying ma rgyud 'bum) that were given by Kyaje Sangye Nyenpa Rinpoche in Bhutan in Tharwa Ling in 2017. The Nyingma Gyübum has a few different collections; this one is the Tsamdrak Barma (འཚམས་བྲག་དཔར་མ། 'tshams brag dpar ma).

This publication contains not only the list of tantras in complete, but also the number of chapters of each book and the name of the translator from Sanskrit to Tibetan. There is also a short history of the Nyingma Gyübum. Link on BDRC.

- Acrostic composed by Tulku Dakpa Rinpoche in 2005
- Biography Mindrolling teachers (chief editor Tulku Dakpa Rinpoche).
- Preface for The Self-Arisen Vidya Tantra (vol 1) and The Self-Liberated Vidya Tantra (vol 2) book
