= Buddhism in Iceland =

Membership in registered non-Christian religious organizations in Iceland. The dark blue line represents Buddhism

Buddhism in Iceland is followed by 0.43% of the population of Iceland, according to the 2021 Census. Buddhism has existed since the 1990s after immigration from countries with Buddhist populations, mainly Thailand. As of 2008, there are three Buddhist organizations in Iceland officially recognized as religious organizations by the Icelandic government. The oldest and largest is the Buddhist Association of Iceland, a Theravada group, which was recognized in 1996 and had 880 members in 2010. Another group, Zen in Iceland – Night Pasture, a Zen group, was recognized in 1999 and had 75 members in 2010. The most recent group is, SGI in Iceland, a Soka Gakkai International group, which was recognized in 2008 with 135 members.

The largest Buddhist organisation in Iceland is the Buddhist Fellowship of Iceland with 1,125 members in 2021. Other Buddhist organisations are the Soka Gakkai International (with 172 members), Zen in Iceland (with 195 members), the Tibetan Buddhist Fellowship (with 38 members), and Diamond Way Buddhism (with 29 members).

The Hádegismóar Temple is a Buddhist temple planned to be built in Reykjavík, Iceland.
