= Khadro Ling Buddhist Temple =

Buddhist temple in Três Coroas, Brazil

- Chagdud Gonpa Khadro Ling
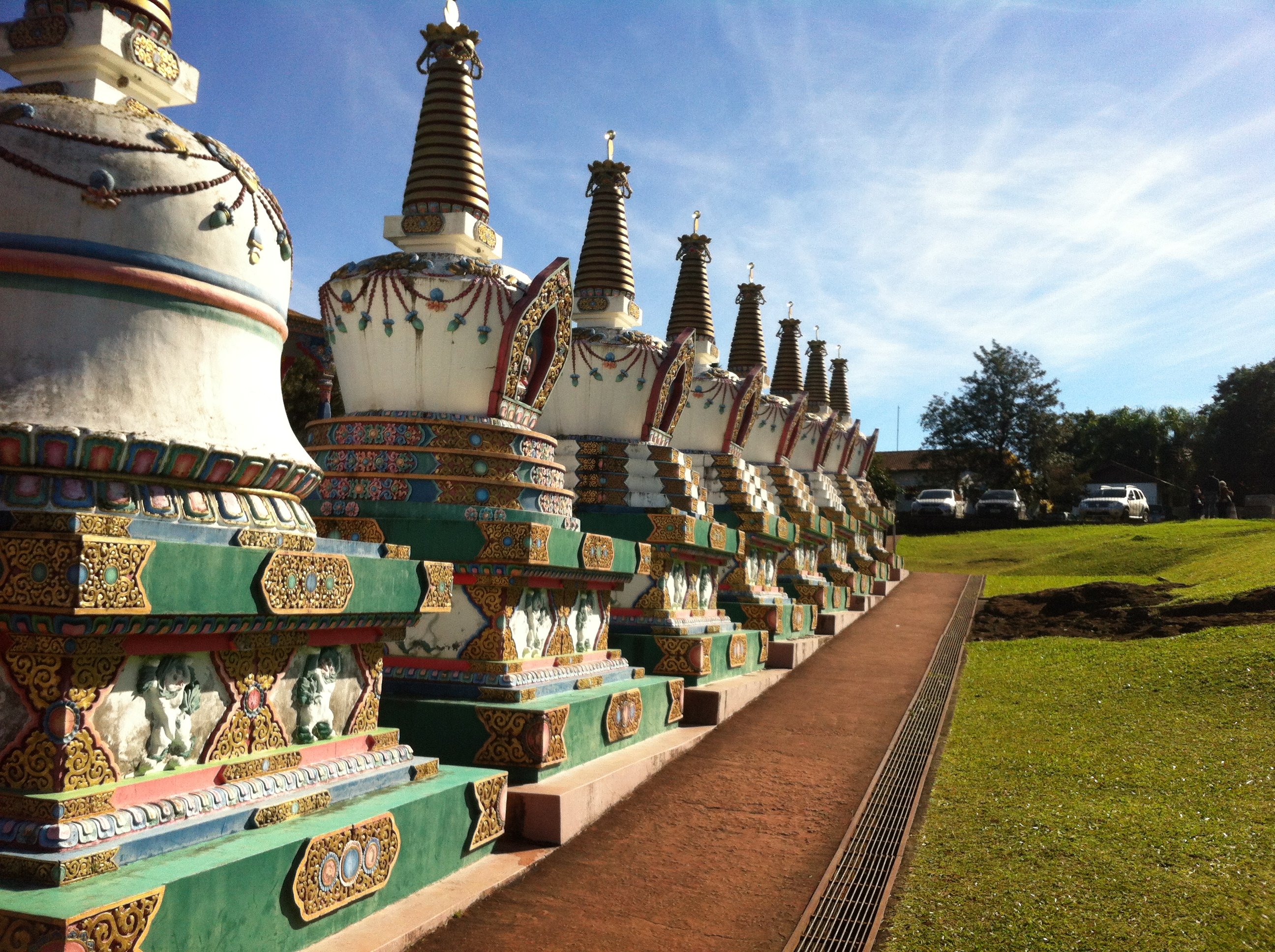
- Interactive map of the Khadro Ling Buddhist Temple area

General information
- Location: Três Coroas, Rio Grande do Sul, Brazil
- Inaugurated: 1995

Website
- kl.chagdud.org

The Buddhist Temple of Chagdud Gonpa Khadro Ling, also known as Khadro Ling Buddhist Temple or simply Buddhist Temple of Três Coroas, is a Buddhist temple of Tibetan traditions located in Três Coroas, Rio Grande do Sul, Brazil.

== The Temple ==
The Khadro Ling temple is located at the top of the mountain in the city of Três Coroas, was founded by the Tibetan master Chagdud Tulku Rinpoche in 1995.

The temple is composed of a community of residents responsible for local maintenance and activities, the temple also adds volunteer workers. As in Tibetan traditions, the community stands out as a layman. Therefore, the people involved can be families, married and maintain relationships.

The natural beauty coupled with the beauty of traditional art has made the temple a tourist spot in the Serra Gaúcha. According to the idealization of Chagdud Rinpoche, the temple was not built for this purpose, but to inspire positively all visitors regardless of their religious beliefs or traditions.
