= Shenphen Rinpoche =

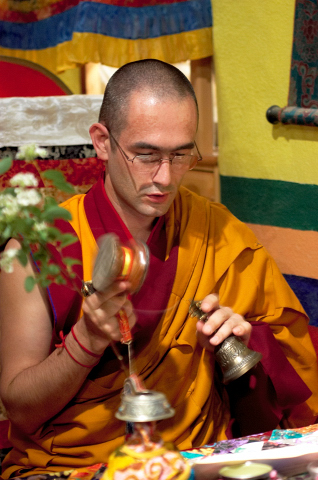
Shenpen Rinpoche in Vienna 2004

Shenphen Rinpoche (born Ronan Chatellier in France) is the spiritual teacher of Buddhist Congregation Dharmaling.
