= Buddharama Temple Fredrika =

Buddhist temple in Sweden

Buddharama Temple
- วัดพุทธาราม
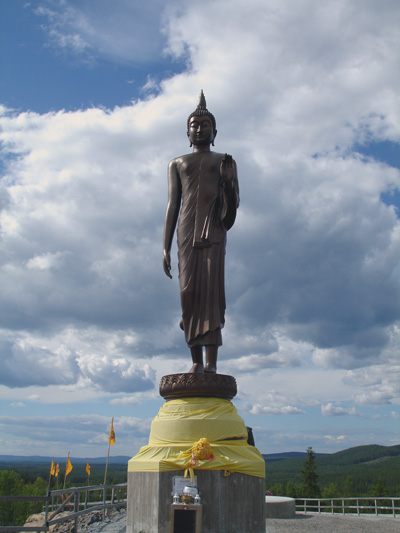
- A Buddha image in Līlā posture at the temple site

- Location within Sweden

Religion
- Affiliation: Theravada Buddhism

Location
- Location: Holmselevägen 68, 919 93 Fredrika
- Country: Sweden
- Interactive map of Buddharama Temple
- Coordinates: 64°4′30.1″N 18°22′11.4″E

Buddharama Temple Fredrika (Thai: วัดพุทธาราม; RTGS: wat phuttharam) is a planned Theravada Buddhist temple (“Wat”) near Fredrika in Åsele Municipality, Sweden. Construction began in 2004, and at that point it was scheduled to become the largest Buddhist temple in Europe. However, due to several economical and practical difficulties, the project was radically downsized and the budget was lowered to about 10% of the initial budget.

As of 2020, construction of the temple itself had yet to begin. The plan is to build a 300 square meter building, but before construction can begin, the organization stated that they intended to pay off their debts of about half a million SEK. The COVID-19 pandemic has also caused further delays of the project.

In 2014, the public-service telecaster Sveriges Television made a 1-hour documentary about the temple project, with the title Tempelriddaren (literally "The Knight Templar"). The documentary is centered around the former municipal commissioner Bert-Rune Dahlberg and his involvement in the project. Dahlberg has been involved in the project since the beginning. His motive has been a hope that this temple may bring large amounts of tourism to Fredrika, which would greatly benefit the municipality economically.

In a scholarly article from 2015, it was stated that Buddharama Temple Sweden had a small temple building nearby, named Wat Buddharama Fredrika, that housed one monk.

== Background ==
Luang Ta, the previous abbot for Buddharama Temple Sweden, died in 2004. The new abbot, Phra Boonthin, visited Umeå in the winter of 2004. During his visit he also visited a Thai Buddhist and her husband living in Fredrika, which is about 100 kilometers west of Umeå. During his visit in Fredrika, Phra Boonthin envisioned a temple building there. His ambition was to build a temple large enough for larger religious gatherings, which were not possible in the smaller temple in Värmdö, also owned by Buddharama Temple Sweden. During the spring of 2005, Phra Boonthin met with the municipal commissioner of Fredrika, the social democrat Bert-Rune Dahlberg, to discuss the temple-plans. Dahlberg helped to find a suitable location for the temple, and the municipality promised to finance the construction of waterlines, sewerage and broadband to the temple.

The plan for the temple was a temple building that could house 300 people, a 20-meter high hill with a Buddha-statue on top in front of the temple, a conference hall with room for 700 to 800 people, a parking lot for around 450 cars, and several small houses for the around 10 monks that were planned to have their permanent residence there. The temple was planned to serve Buddhists from all over Europe.

== Financing ==
The project was initially promised financial support from the Thai government, but the new government, after the 2006 Thai coup d'état, did not fulfill this promise made by the previous government. In 2009 a businessman expressed interest in the project. He stated that he was willing to support the project with eight million SEK. The reason for the sponsorship, according to the businessman, was that he planned to establish a business in Thailand that he thought would benefit from him sponsoring a Buddhist project. The proposed sponsorship was announced publicly, and a local newspaper started investigating the businessman. They discovered that the businessman had a record of fraud, and that he was going to serve a prison sentence in the near future. After this discovery, the temple broke their contact with the businessman. In 2015, a newly appointed Thai ambassador visited the site and promised to search for investors in Thailand. An article in The Local from 2017 stated that the project was being financed by donations only, but in 2020 the former municipal commissioner Bert-Rune Dahlberg was planning on making a visit to Thailand to search for new investors. Due to the COVID-19 pandemic, this trip had to be cancelled. Dahlberg and the municipality has supported the project in hope of it bringing tourists to Fredrika, which would benefit the municipality's economy greatly.

Construction began in 2004, and at that point it was scheduled to become the largest Buddhist temple in Europe, with a budget of 60 million SEK (Swedish krona; equivalent to approximately 5,5-6 million Euro). However, due to the financial difficulties encountered during the project, the project was radically downsized and the budget was lowered to 5-6 million SEK, about 10% of the initial budget. As of 2020, Buddharama Temple Sweden, the organization behind the temple, had a debt of around half a million SEK, which they intended to pay off before construction would continue. At this point, the construction of the temple itself had yet to begin.

== Construction ==
In 2005, an inaugural ceremony was held and the municipality financed the construction of broadband, waterlines and sewerage to the temple-site. In 2006, groundwork was carried out and an 4.5-meter statue of the monk Luang Pu Thuat (1582-1682) was raised. In 2007, in proximity to the statue of Luang Pu Thuat, an 8-meter statue of the Buddha on top of a stage was raised. Two small houses were also built. In 2008, two elephants made out of marble were built in proximity to the previously built statues.
