= Hádegismóar Temple =

Planned Buddhist temple

- Location within Iceland

Religion
- Affiliation: Theravada

Location
- Location: Hádegismóar 12, 110, Reykjavík
- Country: Iceland
- Interactive map of Hádegismóar Temple
- Coordinates: 64°6′40.00″N 21°46′11.00″W

Architecture
- Architect: Vífill Magnússon

Hádegismóar Temple is a planned Buddhist temple, scheduled to be built in Reykjavík, Iceland. It will be funded by foreign sponsors and eventually house the Buddhist Association of Iceland, the country's largest Buddhist group. The temple will be located by Lake Rauðavatn in suburban Reykjavík and will consist of a stupa and two other structures. When completed, it will be the northernmost Buddhist temple in the world, only about 4 kilometres further north than its counterpart in Fredrika, Sweden.

== See also ==
- Buddhism in Iceland
