= Wat Si Muang =

Buddhist temple in Vientiane, Laos

- Lao: ວັດສີເມືອງ
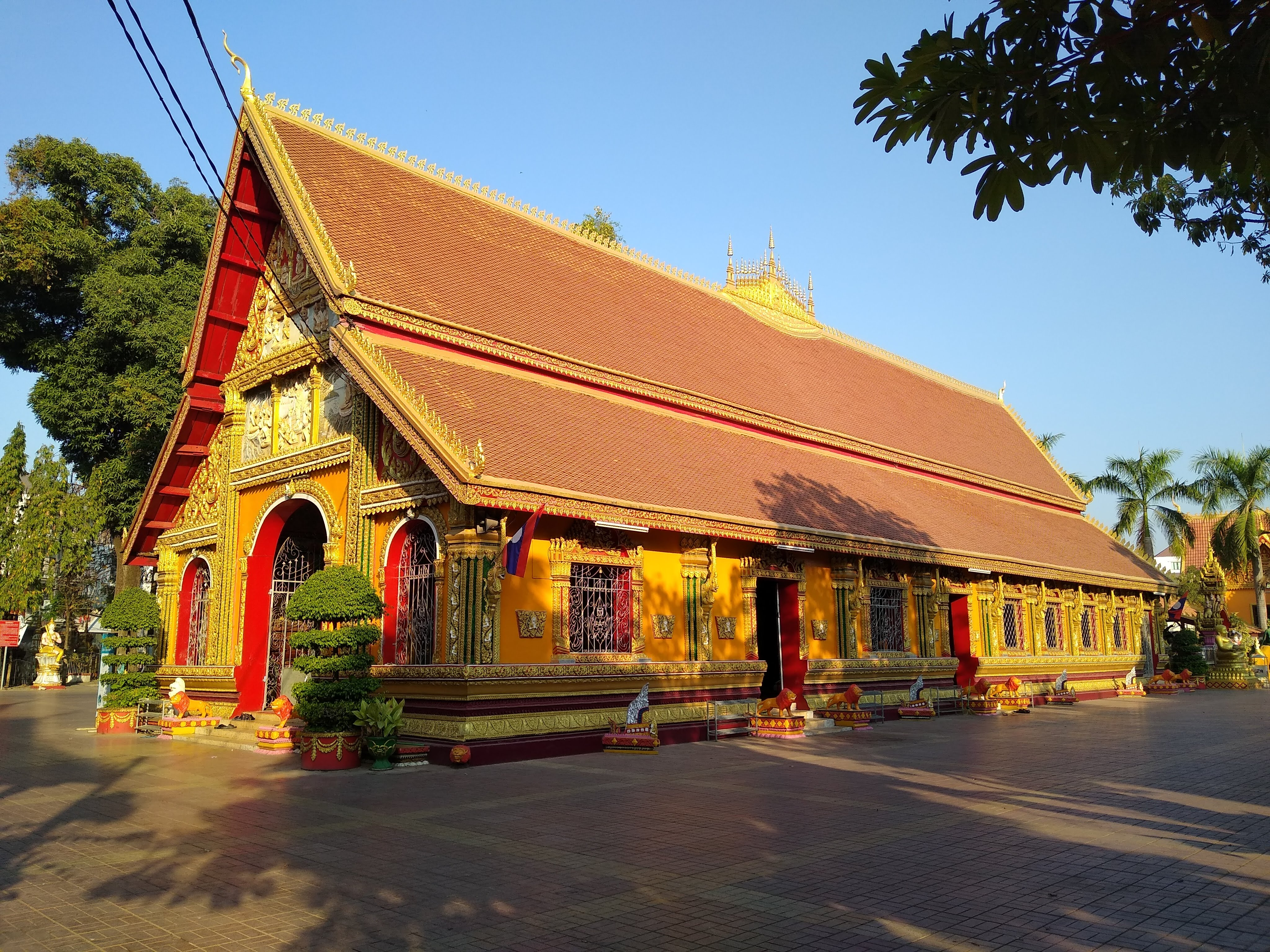

- Location within Laos

Religion
- Affiliation: Buddhism

Location
- Location: Vientiane
- Country: Laos
- Interactive map of Wat Si Muang
- Coordinates: 17.9579°N 102.6171°E

Architecture
- Completed: 1563

Wat Si Muang or Simuong (Lao: ວັດສີເມືອງ, pronounced [wāt sǐː mɯ́aŋ]) is a Buddhist temple in Vientiane, the capital of Laos.

== History ==
The temple was built in 1563, in the former Kingdom of Lan Xang.

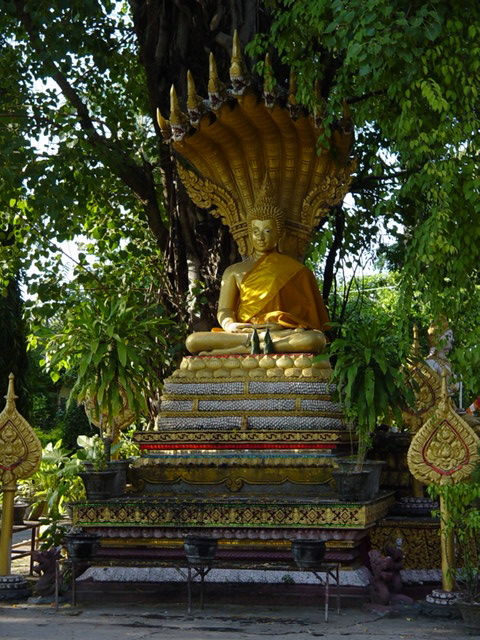
A Buddha statue at the temple

A statue of King Sisavang Vong stands in front of Wat Simuang.

There is a legend that pregnant women at the time of construction were given to as sacrifice to God.

== Description ==
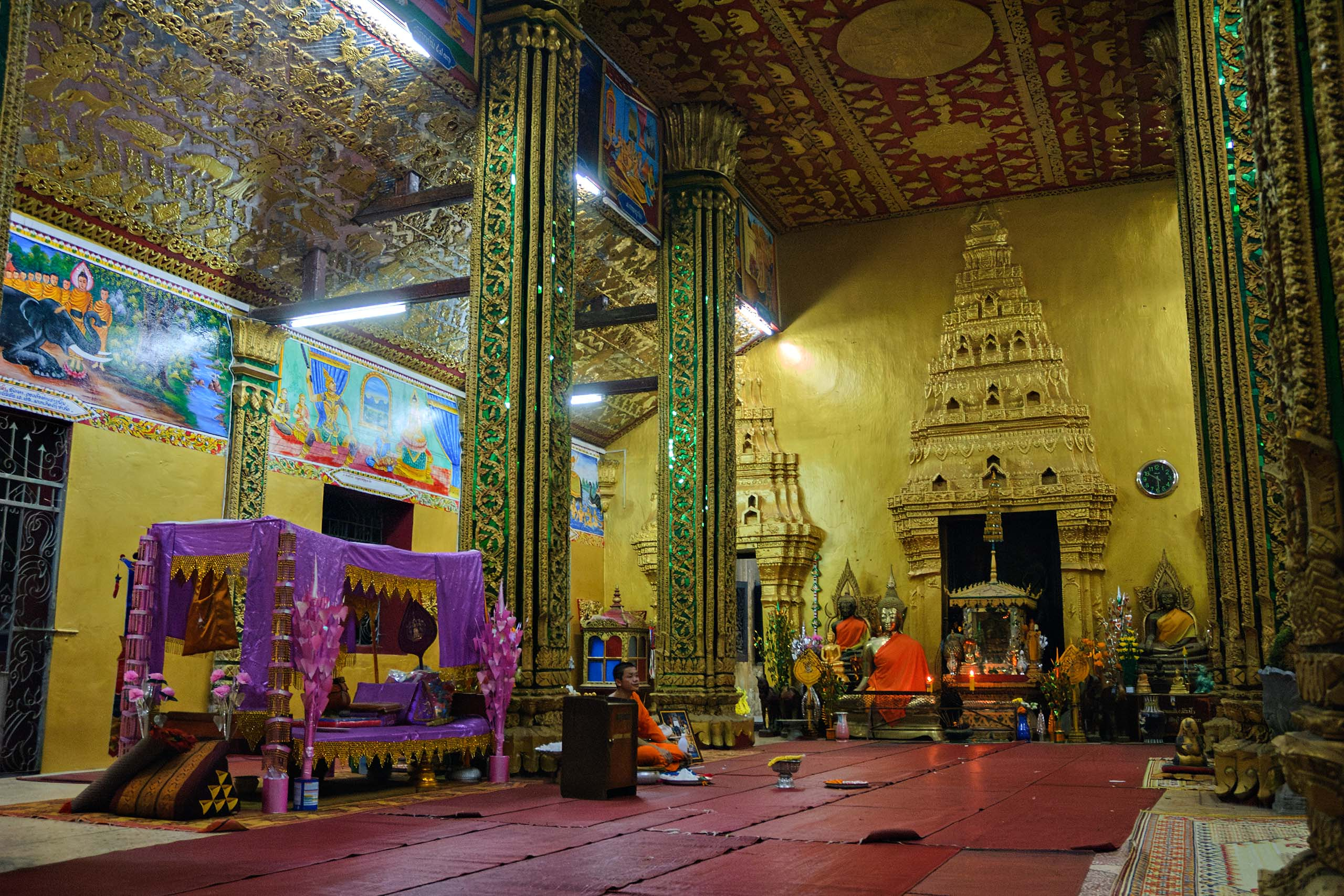
Wat Si Muang front room interior with monk and Buddha stone, Vientiane, Laos

Inside, the temple is unusual in being divided into two rooms. The front room is quiet, with a monk usually on hand to give blessings. The rear room houses the large main altar, with statues and images of the Buddha.

== Gallery ==
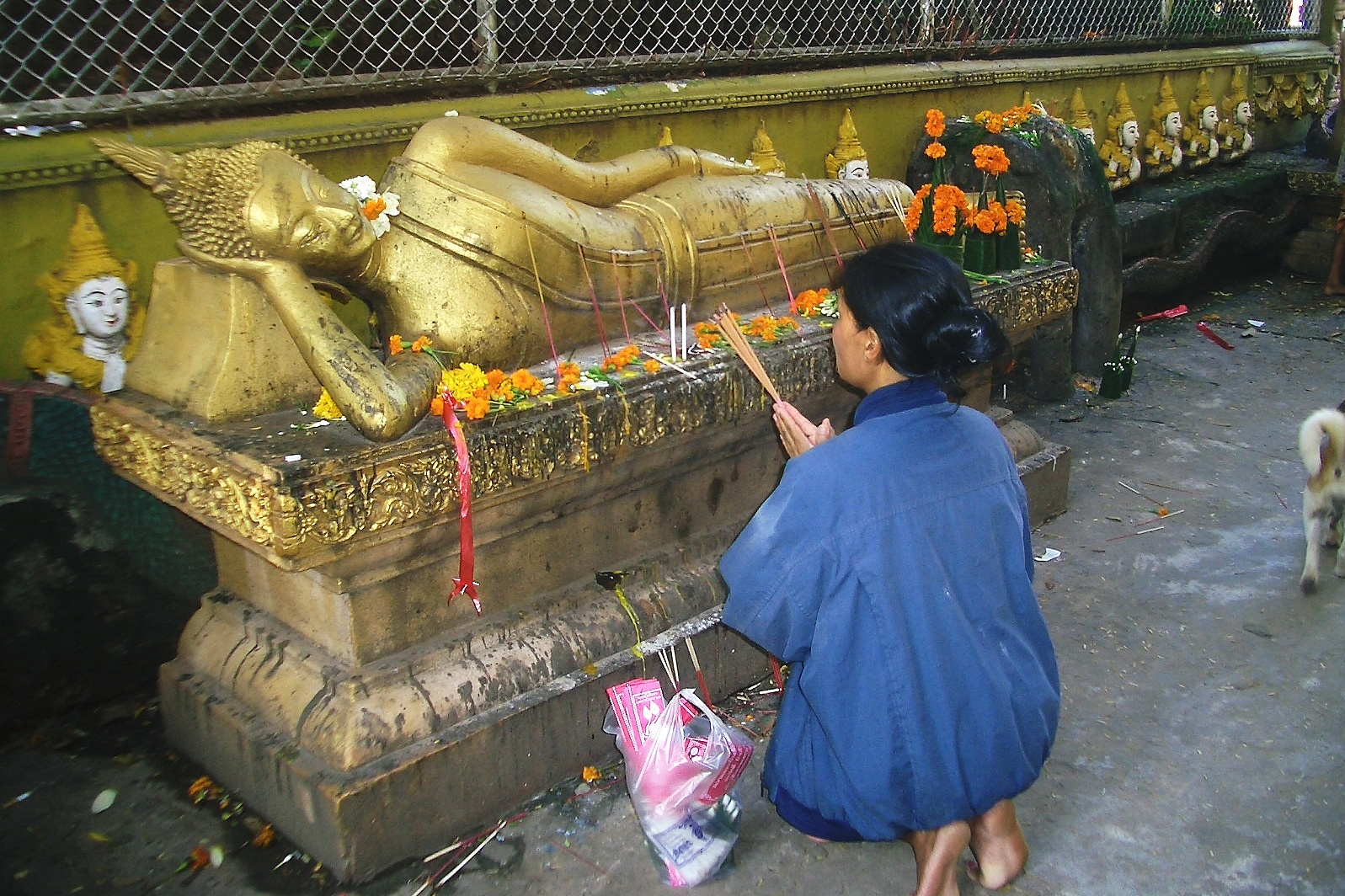
Nirvana Buddha

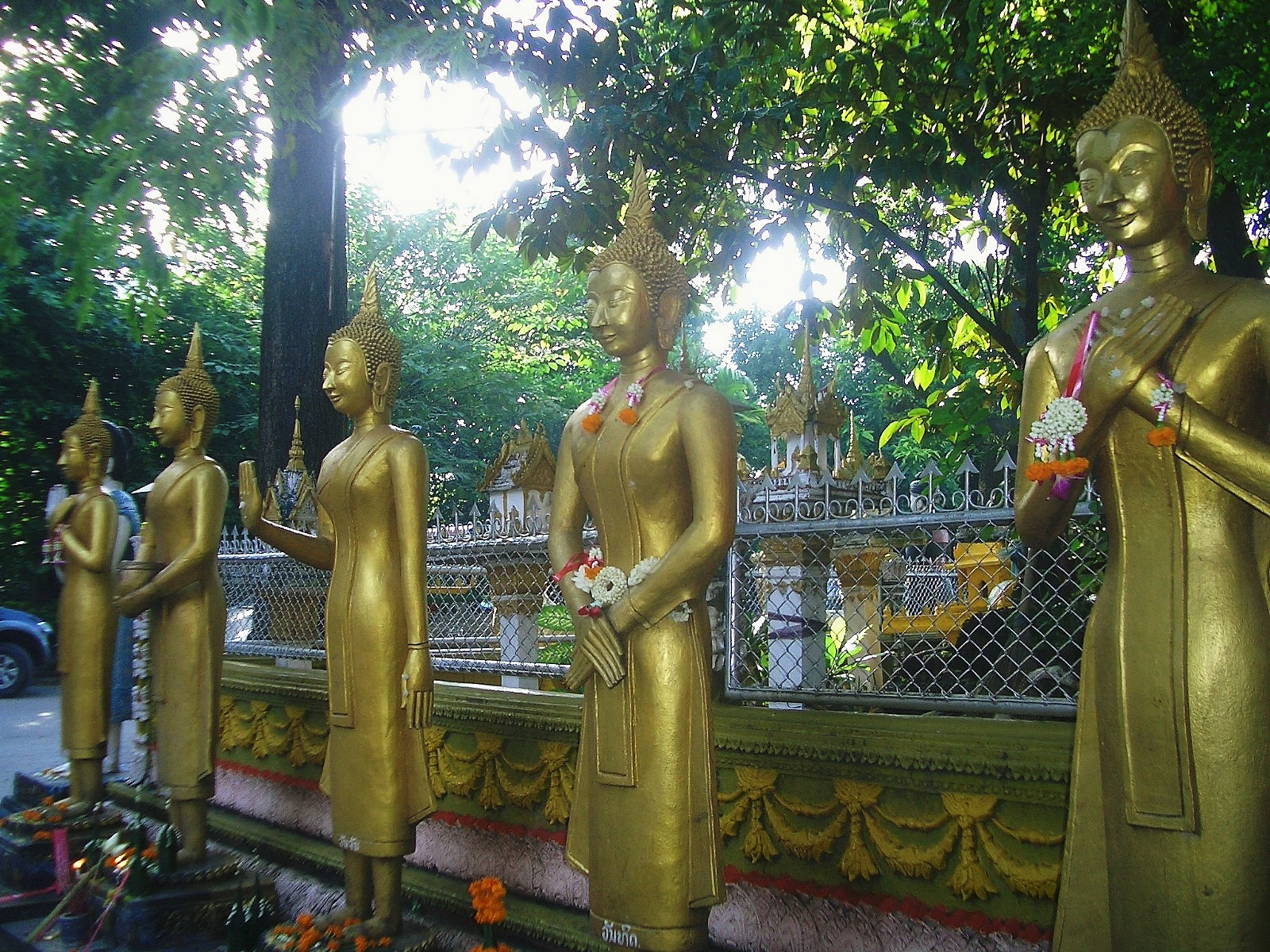
Golden Buddha

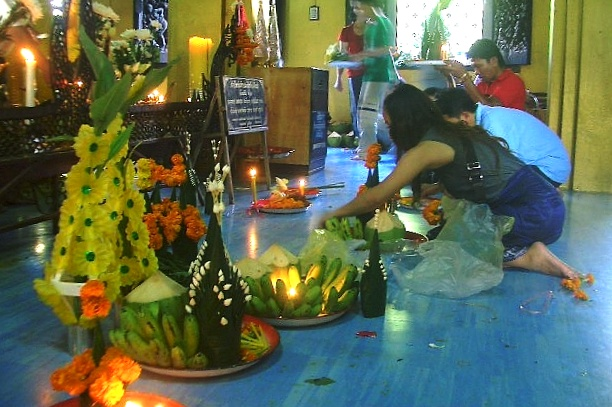

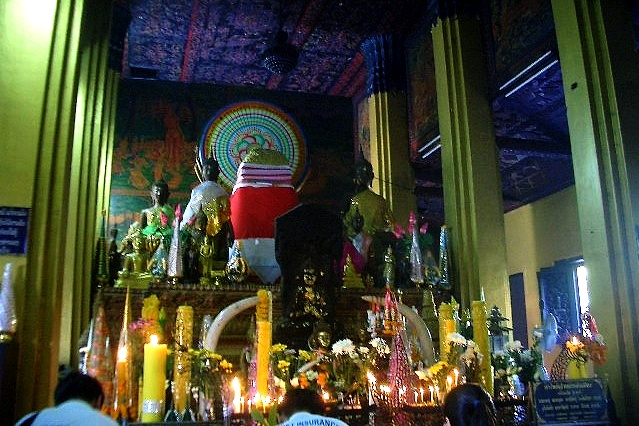
