= Hungarian Shaolin Temple =

Temple in Budapest, Hungary

Coordinates: 47.5551°N 19.2769°E

The Hungarian Shaolin Temple (Magyar Shaolin Központ) is located in a suburb of Budapest. It was founded in 1994, and is the largest such temple in Europe. The temple was founded by Sifu Robert Lyons. Demmel Laszlo join the temple in the mid-1990s.
