= Liên Tâm Monastery =

Buddhist monastery in Turku, Finland

Coordinates: 60.5417°N 22.2978°E

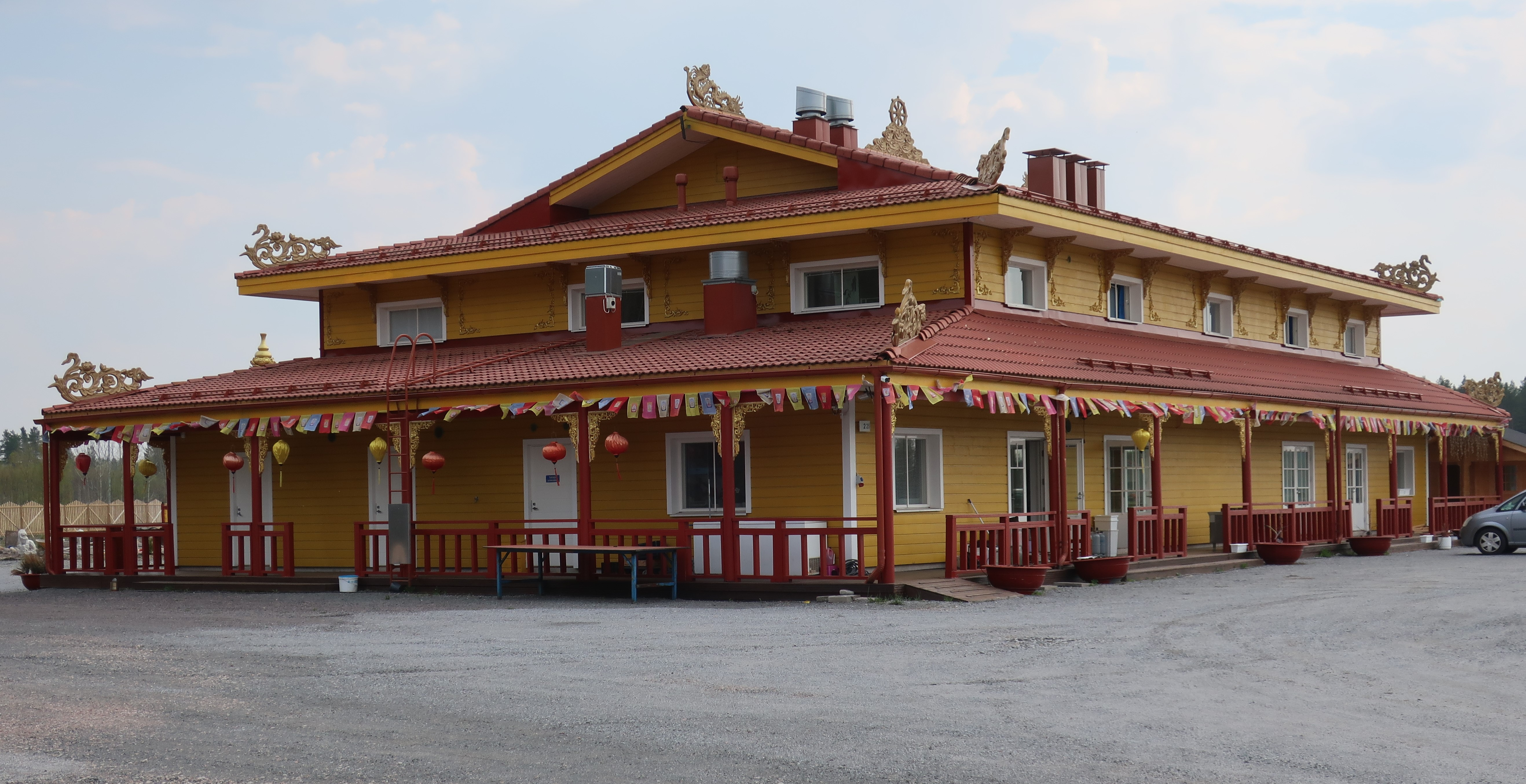
Main building of the monastery in 2021.

Liên Tâm Monastery (previously Lotus Heart Temple) is a Buddhist monastery located in Moisio, Turku. It is the first Buddhist monastery inaugurated in Finland. The monastery is administered by the Vietnamese Buddhist Association of Finland. The association is one of the biggest Buddhist associations in Finland and follows Mahayana. Moreover, Pure Land Buddhism and Zen are practiced in the monastery.

In 2010 during its construction the monastery fell victim to an attempted arson.

== See also ==
- Buddhism in Finland
