= Danakosha Ling =

Finnish Buddhist association belonging to the Nyingma lineage of Tibetan Buddhism

Danakosha Ling (previously known as Danakosha Finland or Nyingmapa-yhteisö) is a Finnish Buddhist association. It represents Nyingma lineage of Tibetan Buddhism and is placed in Jokioinen, Finland.

Since 2005 the association has been registered as a religious community in Finland. In 2019 the association has 47 members. The spiritual leader of the association is Tulku Dakpa Rinpoche. The association is also a member of the Finnish Buddhist Union.

The association is one of the few Buddhist communities that has the right to perform marriage ceremonies.
