= Wat Hosian Voravihane =

Buddhist temple (wat) in Luang Prabang, Laos

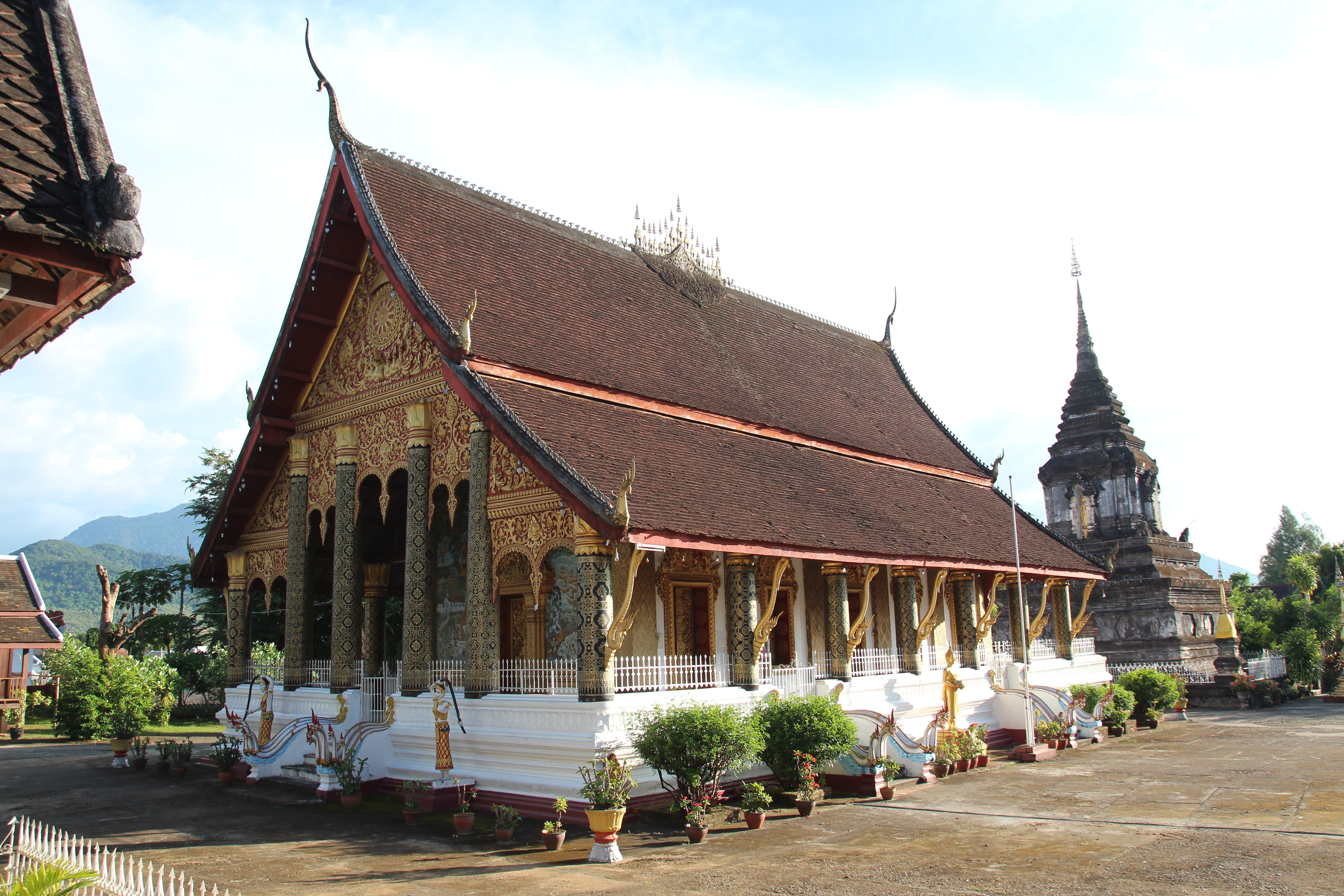

- Location within Laos

Religion
- Affiliation: Buddhism

Location
- Location: Luang Prabang
- Country: Laos
- Interactive map of Wat Hosian Voravihane
- Coordinates: 19°53′15.79″N 102°7′58.02″E

Wat Hosian Voravihane (Lao: ວັດຫົວຊຽງວໍຣະວິຫານ) is a Buddhist temple (wat) in Luang Prabang, Laos.

An active temple, the grounds include living quarters for the monks and a school building.
