= Finnish Buddhist Union =

Buddhist organisation in Finland

- Suomen Buddhalainen Unioni ry (fi); Buddhistiska Unionen i Finland rf (sv)
- Abbreviation: SBU
- Formation: 2009
- Type: NGO
- Legal status: registered organisation
- Purpose: Buddhist umbrella organisation
- Official language: Finnish
- Chairperson: Irma Rinne
- Website: http://www.sbu.fi

Finnish Buddhist Union (Finnish Suomen Buddhalainen Unioni ry), commonly abbreviated SBU, is an umbrella organisation for different Buddhist associations in Finland and is thus not affiliated to any particular school of Buddhism. In total there're around 40 different Buddhist organisations in the country although some of them are not officially registered. The aims of SBU are among other things to represent Buddhist associations in Finland on both national and international level, to make practicing Buddhism easier in Finland, to increase awareness of the religion and participate the public discussion about different world views.

The current chairperson of the organisation is Irma Rinne.

The union was founded on 9 May 2009 and its located in Helsinki though it functions throughout the country. Its first chairperson was Juhani Hakala. The founding members include the following associations:

- Bodhidharma
- Buddhalainen Dharmakeskus
- Finnish-Thai Buddhist Association
- Helsinki Zen Center
- Länsimaisen buddhalaisen veljeskunnan ystävät FWBO
- Suomen Vietnamilaisten Buddhalaisten Yhdyskunta

As of January 2021 the union has 12 member organisations:

Association	School	Locality
Tavallinen Mieli Zendo ry	Zen	Helsinki, Tampere, Jyväskylä
Bodhidharma ry		Helsinki
Buddhalainen Dharmakeskus	Vajrayana	Helsinki, Loimaa
Buddhalainen yhteisö Triratna ry	Independent	Helsinki, Tampere
Danakosha Ling	Tibetan Buddhism	Helsinki, Jokioinen
Finnish-Thai Buddhist Association ry	Theravada	Nurmijärvi
Helsinki Zen Center	Zen	Helsinki
Nirodha ry	Theravada	Hämeenlinna, Joensuu, Jyväskylä, Lahti, Tampere, Turku
Soka Gakkai International Suomi	Mahayana	Rovaniemi, Oulu, Kuopio, Vaasa, Joensuu, Jyväskylä, Pori, Tampere, Lahti, Turku, Ingå, Pääkaupunkiseutu
Suomen vietnamilaisten buddhalaisten yhdyskunta	Mahayana	Turku
Suomen Vietnamilaisten Buddhalaisuus Yhdyskunta (Phúc Lâm)	Mahayana	Vantaa
Tampere Zen ry	Zen	Tampere

The membership is open to a registered Finnish association, congregation or foundation that has been active for at least three years and accepts the core beliefs of the religion. SBU is a member of the European Buddhist Union.

The Finnish National Agency for Education has approved Buddhism as a religion to be taught on a high school level with its own curriculum. The curriculum was written by SBU and then revised by the agency in 2016.
