= Buddhist Congregation Dharmaling =

Coordinates: 46°2′12.47″N 14°30′59.98″E

The Buddhist Congregation Dharmaling is a Buddhist organization, which main office is registered to the Office for religious communities of the Government of Slovenia. Buddhist Congregation Dharmaling is also signatory of an agreement with the State of Slovenia, and is as such the 6th religious community to have signed such agreement in Slovenia (after the four Christian faiths and the Muslim community).

Following primarily the Gelug lineage, the head of the organization, Lama Shenphen Rinpoche – a Western reborn and officially recognized tulku by the Tibetan community – has a non sectarian (Rime) type of approach. The Congregation’s teachings and practices are traditional, but are adapted to be accessible to Westerners and the life they live. A regular program of teaching exists in different countries and more periodical teachings are taking places in other countries where a study group exists. Retreats and seminars are also organized each year.

Dharmaling is also active in the humanitarian fields, through AMCHI non profit organization created since 1989, and its Foundation.

== Background ==
Dharmaling now exists as a registered religious community in Slovenia and Hungary, and as non profit organization in Austria and Russia. There are several groups apart from these main branches, more organized as study groups, regularly organizing the visits of Lama Shenphen Rinpoche, such as in Romania or France.

A premise was purchased in Ljubljana, Slovenia and was consecrated as a Buddhist temple. This became also the main seat of the Buddhist Congregation Dharmaling.

== Spiritual teachers and lineage ==
The main teacher and spiritual director of the organization is Lama Shenphen Rinpoche.

Dharmaling invites teachers of different lineages of Buddhism. As visiting teachers Dharmaling already received Geshe Khedrup a Lharampa Geshe from Sera-Jhe monastery, and Tulku Gyatso a Rinpoche from Kham (Tibet).

=== Lineage ===
The main transmission of teaching and practices is coming from the Gelug tradition, but also from Nyingma and Kagyu schools. The practices are primarily Gelug, but Shenphen Rinpoche has written several practices which are not connected with one school in particular, to allow common practice.

== Activities ==
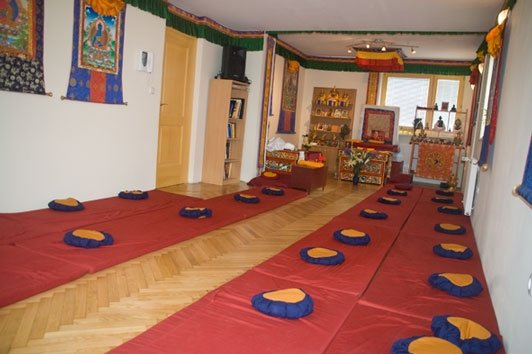
Dharmaling Temple in Ljubljana

=== Program of teachings and practices ===
Dharmaling's program is composed of regular teachings on traditional texts and more general lectures. According to the time and place Rinpoche chooses to follow on a series of teaching, sometimes over several months a specific text, or to give a talk on a specific subject.

Lama Shenphen Rinpoche teaches regularly the root traditional texts: “The 37 practices of a Bodhisattva”, “Lam Rim”, “The Wheel of Sharp Weapons”, “The Heart Sutra”, “Lojong”, but also giving teachings on more general subjects to highlight the understanding of some concepts and find a corresponding way to practice them in everyday life. Among such subjects are “Peace and Emptiness”, “How to deal with emotions”, “Entering the Vajrayana Path”, and “Practice of Bodhicitta in every day life”.

=== Humanitarian activities ===
Dharmaling has engaged in several humanitarian missions, through AMCHI, a non profit organization created to separate the religious activities from the humanitarian ones.

== Notes ==
- (en) Črnič (septembre 2009) "Some dilemmas of sociological study of contemporary political dimensions of religion – the case of the Church of Holy Simplicity" in ESA 2009, Lisboa: Religion and the Sociology of Religion in Europe.
