= Oum Sum =

Cambodian religious figure

Preah Oddommany Oum Sum ព្រះឧត្តមមុនី អ៊ុម ស៊ូ

Personal life
- Born: 1918 Kampong Cham Province, French protectorate of Cambodia
- Died: 2000, age 82 Wat Moha Montrey, Phnom Penh, Cambodia

Religious life
- Religion: Buddhism
- School: Theravada
- Lineage: Tep Vong

Oum Som (February 12, 1918 – March 25, 2000) was a Cambodian intellectual who was considered "the monk with the most clerical education in post-Pol Pot Cambodia" helping to restore Buddhism in Cambodia after the Khmers Rouges had eradicated the sangha.

== Biography ==
=== Living as a monk since childhood ===
Oum Sum was born on February 12, 1918, in Chum Nap village, Chiros commune, Tboung Kmom district in Kampong Cham province. He was the youngest of 12 children and his parents were peasants. He became a novice in 1934 at Wat Neaty Reangsei in his home village.

=== Becoming a Pali expert and a member of the Tripitaka Commission ===
In 1942, he joined the new Pali school in Phnom Penh and resided at Wat Saravan. In 1956, he was asked to join the Tripitaka Commission in which he worked closely with Chuon Nath.

He went on to become the abbot of Wat Keo Preah Phloeung in Phnom Penh, a pagoda that was razed in 1979 after the Vietnamese invasion.

=== Surviving the Khmers rouges ===
As most other monks, he was forced to defrock by the Khmers Rouges. After the fall of Phnom Penh, he joined the forced march to Kampong Cham province where he was impelled to mix cow and buffalo manure as fertilizer. People mocked him from being "cheated by the Buddha for 38 years." For a while he lived at Wat Moha Leap in Koh Sotin district where he was able to continue wearing his safran robe. When orders came from the Angkar to defrock the monks, local authorities thought they applied only to Oum Sum as he had been one of the more intellectual monks. Days later, all the other monks who were living with him were also forced to defrock. In one instance, he was reprimanded for picking up flowers, his guards thinking he would make a floral offering to the Buddha. Even then, he maintained the monastic life-style - never eating after midday and praying in secret once his working day was at an end.

=== Restoring the Buddhist lineage after 1979 ===
After 1979, he was one of the only two monks along with Heng Leang Hor who survived from the Tripitaka Commissions. Oum Sum was in the second group of monks ordained by the first group of monks ordained again after 1979, first of which was Tep Vong. While the Buddhist lineage was thus restored, some accused the new sangha in Cambodia to be led by "Vietnamese monks in Khmer robes," or even a "communist monk" despite the fact that both had been Khmer monks in Cambodia before the fall of Phnom Penh.

=== Reforming the intellectual life of the sangha from 1991 to 2000 ===
In 1993 he became director of the Buddhist Institute. Collecting old books and documents, Oum Sum also began reprinting pre-Khmer Rouge bestsellers such as work by Venerable Huot Tat, who had led the modernist approach since the 1920s. Along with Tep Vong, Oum Sum attempted to develop the healthcare for monks, even travelling to America in the early 1990s to fundraise and building a building for monks at Calmette Hospital and a small infirmary on the grounds of Wat Moha Montrey in 1994.

In 1994, he directed the fundraising effort to build a new stupa for the relics of Buddha previously kept in front of the Royal Railway Station in Phnom Penh and to move installed on top of the hill of Oudong, gathering over 1,5 million dollars.

After the coup in 1997, Oum Som condemned participation in demonstrations and told his novices that the FUNCINPEC party was in league with the Khmer Rouge and should be “sent out of the city.” Oum Som was a prominent critic of the young monks’ demonstrations in 1998 against the politics of Hun Sen.

Samdech Patriarch Oum Sum died on March 25, 2000, at 1:30 am at Wat Moha Montrey where he had been chief monk since 1991. After more than three months of lying in state, King Norodom Sihanouk ignited the fire initiating for the cremation of the Samdech Oum Sum on July 11, 2000, at Wat Botum. The funeral service was led by the Samdech Patriarch Tep Vong and Samdech Patriarch Bou Kry, leaders of the two main Buddhists sects in Cambodia and the eulogy was read by Deputy Prime Minister Sar Kheng.

== Titles ==
Oum Sum held the title of braḥ sāsanāmuni and of samdech after the restoration of royal titles in 1993 by King Norodom Sihanouk. He was until his death the second figure in the hierarchy, the mongol tepeachar.
