= Nil Teang =

First Supreme Buddhist Patriarch of Cambodia

Samdech Preah Moha Sangkha Reach Nil Teang សម្ដេចព្រះមហាសង្ឃរាជ និល ទៀង
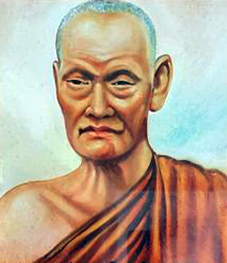
- Modern portrait of Supreme Patriarch Nil Teang
- Title: Supreme Patriarch of Cambodia

Personal life
- Born: 4 July 1824 Kien Svay District, Kandal Province (Cambodia)
- Died: 2 October 1913 Wat Ounalom, Phnom Penh, Cambodia

Religious life
- Religion: Buddhism
- Order: Maha Nikaya
- School: Theravada
- Dharma name: Suvannakesaro (សុវណ្ណកេសរោ)

Samdech Preah Moha Sangkha Reach Nil Teang or Nil Tieng as it was written during the French protectorate of Cambodia, was the first Supreme Patriarch of Cambodia in the Mahanikaya. He held that position during the reign of three consecutive kings: King Preah Ang Duong, King Norodom, King Sisowath.

== Biography ==
=== A Cambodian child ===
Nil Teang was born on Sunday, the 7th day of the month of Ashadha, corresponding to 4 July 1824 in Po Preah Bat district, Kien Svay province, present-day Kien Svay district in Kandal Province. He was the eldest son of a father named Nil and a mother named Lek.

=== Education in Siam ===
In 1831, when Teang was just eight years old, Vietnamese and Siamese troops fought in the Kien Svay area to conquer Cambodia. The family of Teang were captured by the Siamese army and taken to Siam as slaves. Teang and his grandmother were sent to live in Bangkok. He was sent to be educated at Wat Amarinthraram. There, Teang met a young man and future King Ang Duong when he was a prince which the Siamese had also taken captive. The other part of the prince's family was sent by the Siamese to live in Mongkol Borey district in Battambang province.

=== Ordination to the monkhood ===
Nil Teang was fully ordained on May 22, 1844, on Thursday, in Wat Mahathat Yuwaratrangsarit, in front of the Royal Palace in Bangkok, with Somdet Phra Ariyavongsanana V known as Don presiding over the celebration. The King noticed his intellectual capacities and his wit and ability in learning the Pali language impressed the royal court.

=== Return to Cambodia ===
Nil Teang was 25 years old in 1849 when he returned to Cambodia. He went to bid farewell to King Nangklao Rama III. When he arrived in Cambodia, he was welcomed by King Ang Duong who had studied with him in Thailand. After arriving, he wrote a letter to King Nangklao, confirming his strong links with the Thai monarchy.

In 1849, Teang was asked by King Ang Duong to settle in Oudong at Wat Prang by the Royal Palace to restore the state of Buddhism in Cambodia. After his studies in Siam, the King expected him to share what he had learned with his fellow Khmer monks and teach them Pali language and the Buddhist Tripitaka in a more canonical way that what had been done by traditionalist monks.

=== Election as first Patriarch ===
In 1857, King Ang Duong appointed Samdech Preah Maha Sangkha Reach Nil Teang as the first Supreme Patriarch of Cambodia. While he was only 34 years of age, he was considered the most senior monk. At the time when Cambodian was building itself as a modern nation-state and restoring a more systematic religious hierarchy, it is unclear whether the Thammayut was already present as such at that time. Symbolically, at the request of King Ang Duong, Tieng brought back a Buddhist relic from Sri Lanka to be installed in the Prang pagoda that was then restored at the foot of Oudong mountain.

When in 1866 Norodom moved the royal court to Phnom Penh, Tieng followed the movement and established Wat Ounalom as the center of the Mahanikay sect. A modern Khmer inscription (K. 1211) describes the many developments realized under the auspices of Nil Tieng at Wat Ounalom between 1867 and 1890.

After Nil's efforts to bring back peace between King Sisowath and Prince Si Votha in their struggle for power, he gained the trust of the new king Sisowath who relied heavily on Nil's to reform Buddhist in a way similar to what happened in Europe with Josephinism. On October 2, 1881, the King issued an ordinance stating that all Mahanikay monks should follow the precepts and methods established and observed by Samdech Tieng as a way of " tackling anti-Thai and anti-modernist dissidents within the Mahanikay."

In 1892, Nil Teang began the construction of the Silver Pagoda in the Royal Palace for King Norodom. The building was completed in 1902, two years before the death of its promoter. He also contributed to the renovation of many other pagodas such at Wat Hanchey in Kampong Cham province.

=== Death ===
Nil Teang died aged 90, on October 2, 1913 at Wat Ounalom in Phnom Penh. He was cremated the next year in 1914 with pump and circumstance, with cohorts of monks and religious in attendance, from Thailand and Vietnam as well. Temple baku celebrating traditional vedic rituals were also involved. The whole funeral was presided over by Venerable Thong, who would become his successor in leading the reform of Buddhism in Cambodia. One year after his death, the less popular, and less educated, Venerable Ker Ouk, was appointed as head of the Mahanikay even though he was never given the title of Supreme Patriarch.

== Legacy ==
=== Establishing a modern Buddhist hierarchy in Cambodia ===
In 1880, Norodom established two patriarchs Pan and Tieng respectively for the Thammayut and the Maha Nikay sects to structure the hierarchy of Buddhism in Cambodia. The king confirmed seniority of the majority Mahanikay Sanghareach, Tieng over Pan, while the latter and his followers in minority became the official chaplains of the monarchy.

This new organization of the sangha was done along the same lines at Buddhist hierarchy in Thailand and similar reforms were being applied in Southeast Asia in order to modernize Buddhism.

At the same time, other religions in Cambodia where also becoming more organized. Thus, the first apostolic vicar was appointed in Phnom Penh for the Catholic Church. And Teang himself, until his death was in charge to name the head of the Cham mosques for the Muslims of Cambodia since the 1880 royal ordinance of King Norodom.

=== Restoring the Khmer intellectual tradition ===
Nil Teang is the symbol of the restoration of the Cambodia intellectual tradition. Since the fall of Longvek, the legend of Preah Ko Preah Keo served to justify the decadence of Khmer studies as all the sacred texts supposedly stored had been taken hostage by the Siamese invaders. After his studies in Siam, Nil Teang was in a way able to bring this knowledge back to Cambodia. Nil Tieng was considered not only to be expert in Khmer literature but also to be fluent in Thai, Pali and Sanskrit. in his 1880 convocation, Norodom ordered Nil Teang to gather the most learned monks in Cambodia in the Royal Palace to promote the knowledge of the Tripitaka within the Cambodian sangha and to begin the translation of Pali canon into Khmer.

This achievement culminated with the founding of two Pali schools in Cambodia. Symbolically, the first one was opened on August 13, 1909, at Angkor Wat, in the territory returned to Cambodia by Thailand only two years earlier, but it did not last long however. The second one was opened in Phnom Penh in 1911 and it went on to become the Superior School of Pali which has now grown into the Preah Sihanouk Raja Buddhist University.

=== The birth of Cambodian Buddhist nationalism ===
Nil Teang was one of the earliest representatives of Cambodian nationalist monks. As patriarch, he took an active role in politics and was instrumental in resolving the crisis after the rebellion of Prince Si Votha against his brother Norodom in 1864.

Though he did not speak French, he did not oppose the French protectorate of Cambodia, as he saw it as a means to restore the territorial integrity of the Khmer nation, stuck between a tiger and a crocodile, between Siam and Annam.

== Awards and recognitions ==
During his life, Nil Teang was knighted as Chevalier de la Légion d’Honneur and of the Royal Order of Cambodia.

== Bibliography ==
- Li Sovar, The Holy Life of his Holiness the Supreme Patriarch Nil Tieng of the Mahanikay Sect (in Khmer), Phnom Penh:The Buddhist Institute, 2004.
- Harris, Elizabeth J. (2008-03-11). "5. Cambodian Buddhism under Colonial Rule". Cambodian Buddhism. University of Hawaii Press. pp. 105–130. doi:10.1515/9780824861766-006. ISBN 978-0-8248-6176-6.
