= Buddhism in Cambodia =

Total population
- c. 16.6 million (97.1%) in 2024

Regions with significant populations
- Throughout Cambodia

Religions
- Theravada Buddhism

Languages
- Khmer, Pali and other languages

Buddhism in Cambodia or Khmer Buddhism (Khmer: ព្រះពុទ្ធសាសនានៅកម្ពុជា, UNGEGN: Preăh Pŭtthôsasânéa noŭ Kâmpŭchéa) has existed since at least the 5th century. In its earliest form it was a type of Mahāyāna Buddhism. Today, the predominant form of Buddhism in Cambodia is Theravada Buddhism. It is enshrined in the Cambodian constitution as the official religion of the country. Theravada Buddhism has been the Cambodian state religion since the 13th century (except during the Khmer Rouge period). As of 2019 it was estimated that 97.1 percent of the population are Buddhists.

The history of Buddhism in Cambodia spans a number of successive kingdoms and empires. Buddhism entered Cambodia via two different streams. The earliest forms of Buddhism, along with Hindu influences, entered the Kingdom of Funan with Hindu merchants. In later history, a second stream of Buddhism entered Khmer culture during the Angkor empire when Cambodia absorbed the various Buddhist traditions of the Mon kingdoms of Dvaravati and Haripunchai.

For the first thousand years of Khmer history, Cambodia was ruled by a series of Hindu kings with an occasional Buddhist king, such as Jayavarman I of Funan, Jayavarman VII, who became a mahayanist, and Suryavarman I. A variety of Buddhist traditions co-existed peacefully throughout Cambodian lands, under the tolerant auspices of Hindu kings and the neighboring Mon-Theravada kingdoms.

== History ==
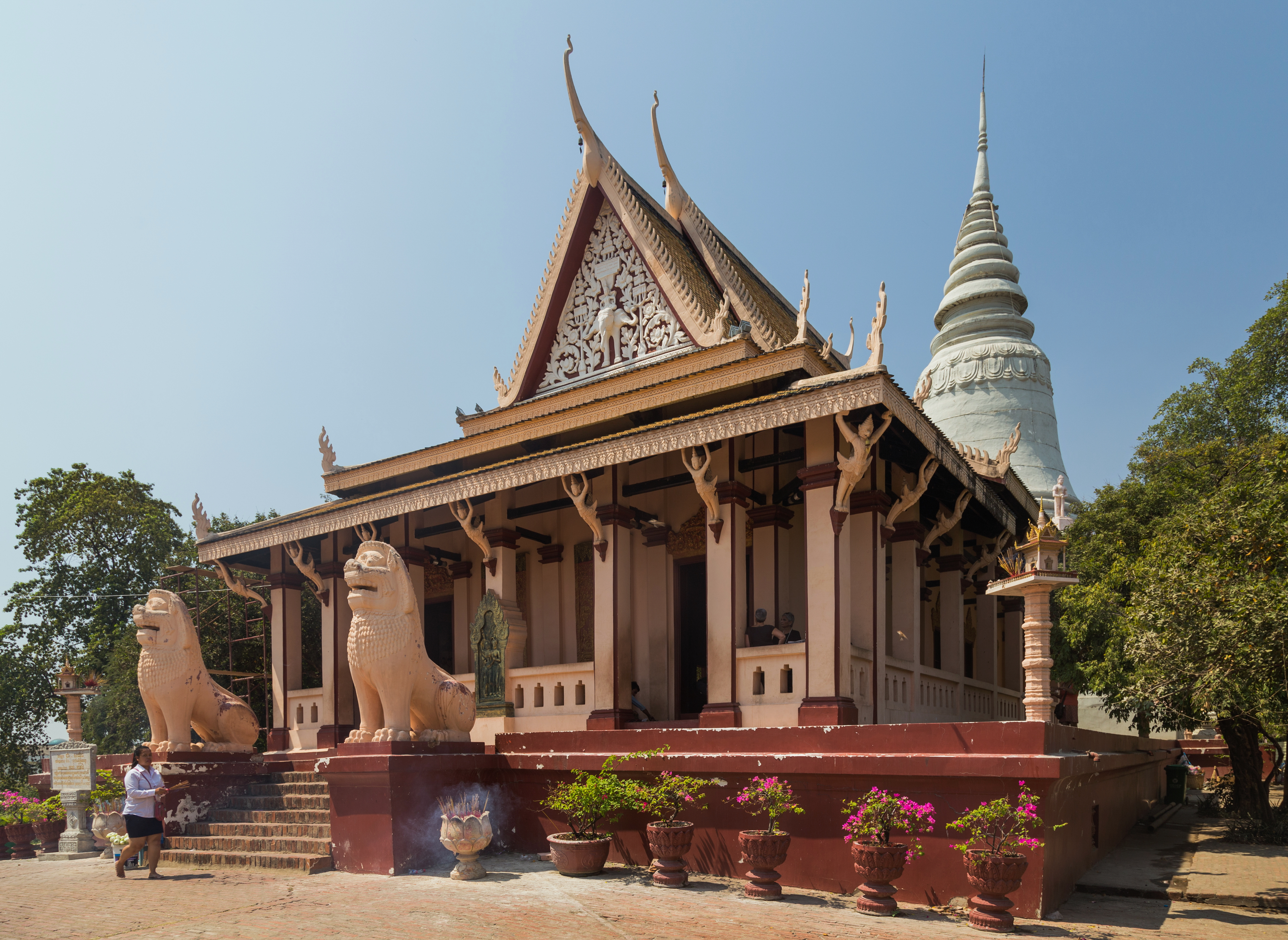
Wat Preah Chedey Borapaut

=== Possible early missions ===
Unconfirmed Singhalese sources state that Buddhism was introduced to Suvannaphum, or the 'Golden Peninsula', as mainland Southeast Asia was once referred to, in the 3rd century B.C. under the reign of King Ashoka, the great Buddhist ruler. According to these sources, two monks, Sona and Uttara, were sent to propagate the doctrine of the Master in this region following the great council of 274 B.C. held in Asoka's capital Pataliputta, India. Various Buddhist sects competed with Brahmanism and indigenous animistic religions over approximately the next millennium; during this period, Indian culture was highly influential.

=== Funan ===
The Funan Kingdom that flourished between 100 BC and 500 CE was Hindu, with the kings of Funan sponsoring the worship of Vishnu and Shiva. Buddhism was already present in Funan as a secondary religion in this era. Buddhism began to assert its presence from about year 450 onward, and was observed by the Chinese traveler Yijing toward the close of the seventh century.

Two Buddhist monks from Funan, named Mandrasena and Saṃghabara, took up residency in China in the 5th to 6th centuries, and translated several Buddhist sūtras from Sanskrit into Chinese. Among these texts is the Mahāyāna Mahāprajñāpāramitā Mañjuśrīparivarta Sūtra. This text was separately translated by both monks. The bodhisattva Mañjuśrī is a prominent figure in this text.

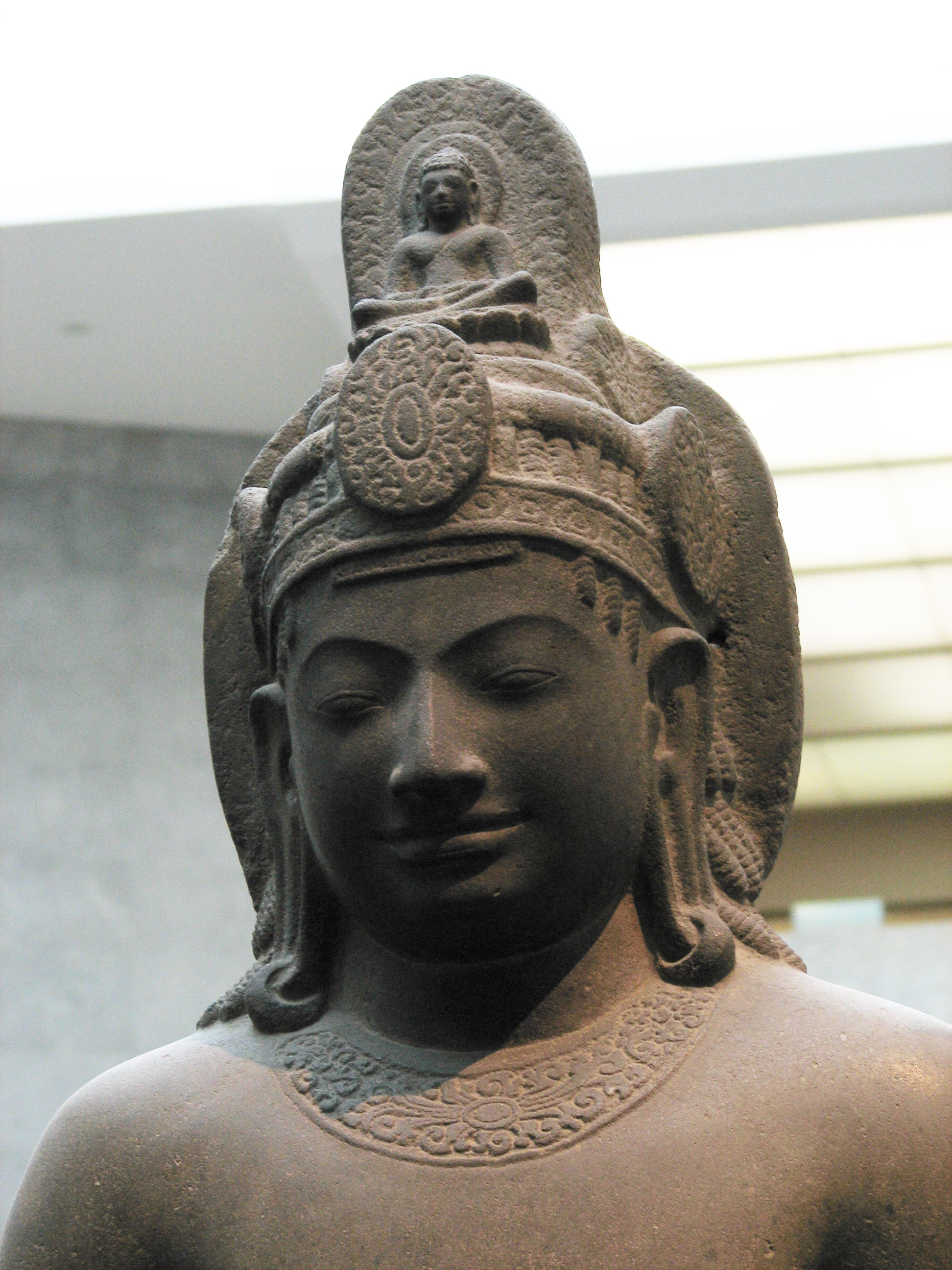
Cambodian statue of Avalokiteśvara Bodhisattva. Sandstone, 7th century CE.

=== Chenla ===
The Kingdom of Chenla replaced Funan and endured from 500–700. Buddhism was weakened in the Chenla period, but survived, as seen in the inscriptions of Sambor Prei Kuk (626) and those of Siem Reap dealing with the erection of statues of Avalokiteśvara (791). Some pre-Angkorean statuary in the Mekong Delta region indicate the existence of Sanskrit-based Sarvāstivāda Buddhism. Khmer-style Buddha images are abundant from the period of 600–800. Many Mahāyāna bodhisattva images also date from this period, often found alongside the predominantly Hindu images of Shiva and Vishnu. An inscription from Ta Prohm temple in Siem Reap province, dated about 625, states, that the Buddha, Dharma and Sangha are flourishing.

=== Angkor ===
The transition from Hindu god-king to Mahayana bodhisattva-king was probably gradual and imperceptible. The prevailing Vaishnavite and Shaivite faith traditions gave way to the worship of the Gautama Buddha and the Bodhisattva Avalokitesvara.

The Buddhist Sailendra kingdom exercised suzerainty over Cambodia as a vassal state during the end of the eighth and the beginning of the ninth centuries. King Jayavarman II (802–869), the first king of the Angkor period, proclaimed himself Hindu god-king and identified himself with Shiva. Nevertheless, he was increasingly friendly to and supportive of Mahayana Buddhist influence throughout his kingdom. Mahayana Buddhism became increasingly established in his empire. The form of Mahayana Buddhism that was propagated in the Srivijaya lands was similar to the Pala Dynasty Buddhism of Bengal, and of the Nalanda University in northern India.

The Bengal University of Nalanda in Megadha (now Behar) was the theological center of Mahayana Buddhism under the protection of the Pala Dynasty [750-1060]. Shivaist interpretations of Buddhism, tinged with Tantric mysticism (that may have revived portions of pre-Aryan northeastern Indian faith traditions) were worked out in Megadha and then were exported throughout insular and peninsular Southeast Asia, particularly to Java. Yashovarman I (889-910), who ruled from the vicinity of Rolous in the late ninth century, seems to have been a Shivite Buddhist influenced by Nalanda syncretism. His successors (notably Jayavarman IV) dedicated themselves to Hindu trinity such as Vishnu and Brahma, as well as to Shiva, with whom they continued to be identified by hereditary families of priests. Rajendravarman II studied Buddhism intensely.

The Sailendra dynasty also built the fantastic Mahayana Buddhist temple Borobudur (750–850) in Java. Borobudur appears to have been the inspiration for the later fabulous Angkor building projects in Cambodia, particularly Angkor Wat and Angkor Thom.

The primary form of Buddhism practiced in Cambodia during Angkor times was Mahayana Buddhism, strongly influenced with Tantric tendencies.

The prevalence of Tantrayana in Java, Sumatra and Kamboja [Cambodia], a fact now definitely established by modern researches into the character of Mahayana Buddhism and Saivism in these parts of the Indian Orient. Already in Kamboja inscription of the 9th century there is definite evidence of the teaching of Tantric texts at the court of Jayavarman II. In a Kamboja record of the 11th century there is a reference to the 'Tantras of the Paramis'; and images of Hevajra, definitely a tantric divinity, have been recovered from amidst the ruins of Angkor Thom. A number of Kamboja inscriptions refer to several kings who were initiated into the Great Secret (Vrah Guhya) by their Hindu Brahmin gurus; the Saiva records make obvious records to Tantric doctrines that had crept into Saivism.

But it was in Java and Sumatra that Tantrayana seems to have attained greater importance. There Mahayana Buddhism and Shaivism, both deeply imbued with tantric influences, are to be seen often blending with one another during this period. The Sang Hyang Kamahayanikan, consisting of Sanskrit versus explained by an Old Javanese commentary, professed to teach the Mahayana and Mantrayana.

The presence and growing influence of Buddhism continued as the Angkor empire increased in power. King Yosavarman built many Buddhist temples in 887–889, representing the mandala of Mount Meru, the mythical axis of the world. The largest of these temples is Phnom Kandal or "Central Mountain" which lies near the heart of the Angkor complex.

King Rajendravarman II (944–968) "studied Buddhism intensely. Although he decided to remain a Shivaist, he appointed a Buddhist, Kavindrarimathana, chief minister. Kavindrarimathana built shrines to Buddha and Shiva. Jayavarman V (son of Rajendravarman) also remained a devote of Shiva. He, too, permitted his own chief minister, Kirtipandita, to foster Mahayana Buddhist learning and divination."

=== Suryavarman I ===
Suryavarman I (1006–1050) is considered the greatest of the Buddhist kings, with the exception of Jayavarman VII.

The origins of Suryavarman I are unclear but evidence suggests that he began his career in northeastern Cambodia. He came to the throne after a period of disputes between rival claims to the Khmer throne. Claim to the Khmer throne did not exclusively include paternal lines but also recognized the royal maternal line, giving prominence to whichever line successfully supported the legitimacy of the claim.

A strong proponent of Mahayana Buddhism, he did not interfere or obstruct the growing presence and dissemination of Theravada Buddhism during his reign.

Indeed, inscriptions indicate he sought wisdom from wise Mahayanists and Hinayanists and at least somewhat disestablished the Sivakaivalya family's hereditary claims to being chief priests (purohitar). Surayvarman's posthumous title of Nirvanapada, 'the king who has gone to Nirvana' is the strongest evidence that he was a Buddhist."

=== Jayavarman VII ===
Naga-enthroned Buddha statue, 12th century, Angkor

Jayavarman VII (1181–1215), the most significant Khmer Buddhist king, worked tirelessly to establish Buddhism as the state religion of Angkor.Jayavarman VII was a Mahayana Buddhist, and he regarded himself to be a Dharma-king, a bodhisattva, whose duty was to "save the people" through service and merit-making, liberating himself in the process. Jayavarman withdrew his devotion from the old gods and began to identify more openly with Buddhist traditions. His regime marked a clear dividing line with the old Hindu past. Before 1200, art in the temples mostly portrayed scenes from the Hindu pantheon; after 1200, Buddhist scenes began to appear as standard motifs.

During Jayavarman VII's reign, there was a shift away from the concept of devaraja god-king, toward the concept of the sangha, or monks-led community. In former times, great effort and resources were invested into building temples for elite brahman priests and god-kings. Under Jayavarman, these resources were redirected to building libraries, monastic dwellings, public works, and more "earthly" projects accessible to the common people.

While Jayavarman VII himself was Mahayana Buddhist, the presence of Theravada Buddhism was increasingly evident.}

This Singhalese-based Theravada Buddhist orthodoxy was first propagated in Southeast Asia by Taling (Mon) monks in the 11th century and together with Islam in the 13th century in southern insular reaches of the region, spread as a popularly-based movement among the people. Apart from inscriptions, such as one of Lopburi, there were other signs that the religious venue of Suvannabhumi were changing. Tamalinda, the Khmer monk believed to be the son of Jayavarman VII, took part in an 1180 Burmese-led mission to Sri Lanka to study the Pali canon and on his return in 1190 had adepts of the Sinhala doctrine in his court. Chou Ta-Laun, who led a Chinese mission into Angkor in 1296-97 confirms the significant presence of Pali Theravada monks in the Khmer Capital."

=== Decline of Angkor and the emergence of a Theravada kingdom ===
After the 13th century Theravada Buddhism became the state religion of Cambodia.

King Jayavarman VII had sent his son Tamalinda to Sri Lanka to be ordained as a Buddhist monk and study Theravada Buddhism according to the Pali scriptural traditions. Tamalinda then returned to Cambodia and promoted Buddhist traditions according to the Theravada training he had received, galvanizing and energizing the long-standing Theravada presence that had existed throughout the Angkor empire for centuries.

During the time Tamalinda studied at the famous Mahavihara Monastery in Sri Lanka (1180–1190), a new dynamic type of Theravada Buddhism was being preached as the "true faith" in Sri Lanka. This form of Buddhism was somewhat militant and highly disciplined in reaction to the wars with the Tamil that nearly destroyed Buddhism in Sri Lanka in the 9th and 10th centuries. As Theravada Buddhism struggled for survival in Sri Lanka, it developed a resiliency that generated a renaissance throughout the Buddhist world, and would eventually spread across Burma, Chiang Mai, the Mon kingdoms, Lanna, Sukhothai, Laos, and Cambodia.

In the 13th century, wandering missionaries from the Mon-Khmer-speaking parts of Siam, Burma, Cambodia, and Sri Lanka played an important part in this process.

When Prince Tamalinda returned after ten years of ordination, he was a Thera, a senior monk, capable of administering ordination into this vigorous Theravada lineage, which insisted on orthodoxy and rejected Mahayana "innovations" such as tantric practices.

The mass conversion of Khmer society to Theravada Buddhism amounted to a nonviolent revolution every all level of society. Scholars struggle to account for this sudden and inexplicable transformation of Khmer civilization. Theravada Buddhism succeeded because it was inclusive and universal in its outreach, recruiting the disciples and monks from not only the elites and court, but also in the villages and among the peasants, enhancing its popularity among the Khmer folk.

The post-Angkor period saw the dramatic rise of the Pali Theravada tradition in Southeast Asia and concomitant decline of the Brahmanic and Mahayana Buddhist religious traditions. A 1423 Thai account of a mission to Sri Lanka mentions eight Khmer monks who again brought orthodox Mahavihara sect of Singhalese order to Kampuchea. This particular event belied, however, the profound societal shift that was taking place from priestly class structure to a village-based monastic system in Theravada lands. While adhering to the monastic discipline, monks developed their wats, or temple-monasteries, not only into moral religious but also education, social-service, and cultural centers for the people. Wats became the main source of learning and popular education. Early western explorers, settlers, and missionaries reported widespread literacy among the male populations of Burma, Thailand, Kampuchea, Laos, and Vietnam. Until the 19th century, literacy rates exceeded those of Europe in most if not all Theravada lands. In Kampuchea, Buddhism became the transmitter of Khmer language and culture.

With the rise of Siam in the west and Vietnam in the east, the classical Angkor empire disappeared and the beginning of present-day Cambodia began. Cambodia became from this time forward a Theravada Buddhist nation.

=== Buddhist Middle Ages ===
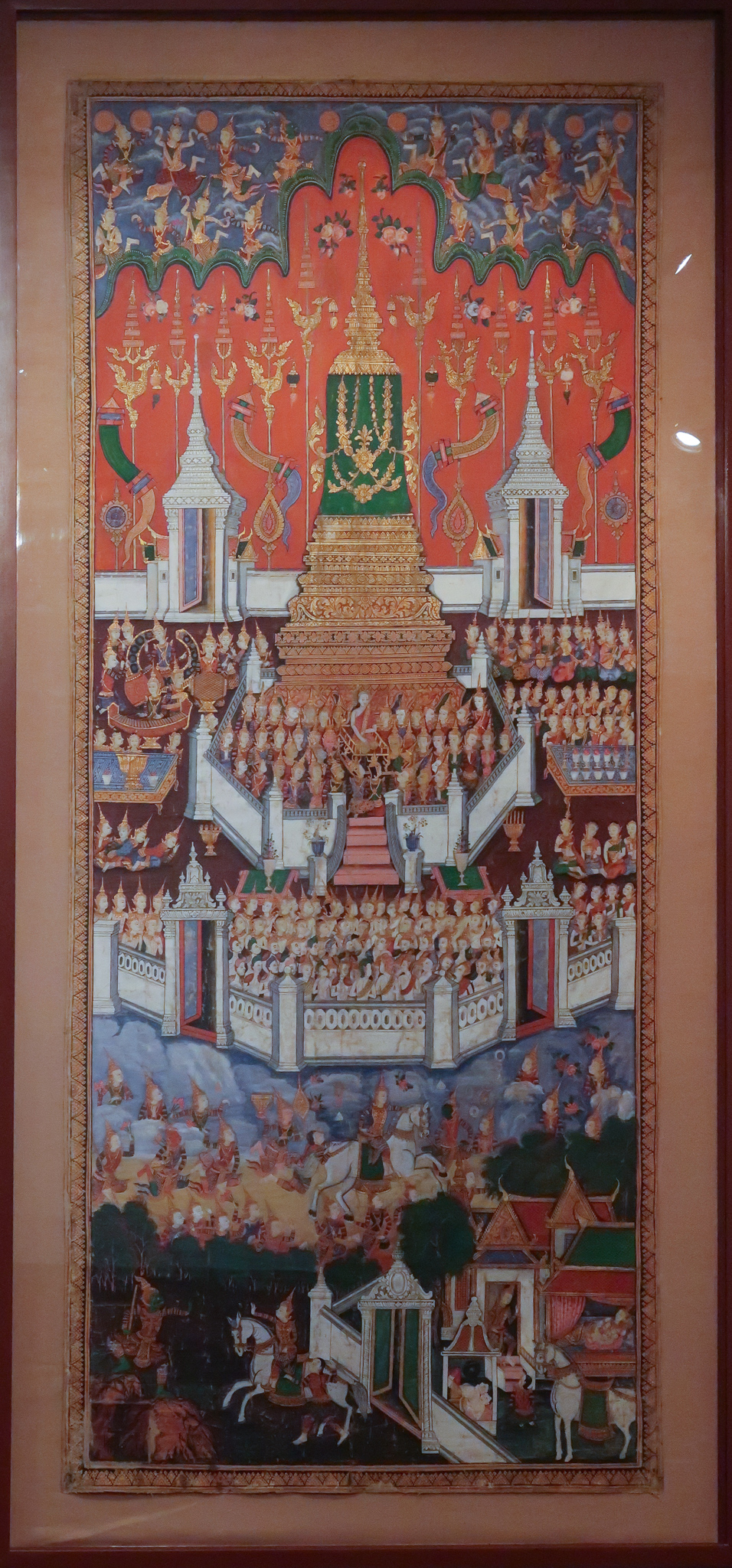
Life of Gautama Buddha painting. Cambodia. 18th century. Toulon Asian Art Museum.

The Jinakalamali gives an account of the cultural connections between Cambodia and Sri Lanka in the fifteenth century. It states that 1967 years after the Mahaparinibbana of the Buddha, eight monks headed by Mahananasiddhi from Cambodia with 25 monks from Nabbispura in Thailand came to Sri Lanka to receive the upasampada ordination at the hands of the Sinhalese Mahatheras.

As Angkor collapsed under the advancing jungles, the center of power of the Theravada Cambodia moved south toward present day Phnom Penh. Phnom Penh was originally a small riverside market center where the Mekong River and the Tonle Sap River converge.

Phnom Penh was founded when Lady Penh found a "four-faced Buddha" floating down the river on a Koki tree during the flooding season. She retrieved the Buddha image and had the Wat Phnom constructed to house the image. The four-faced Buddha [Buddha facing the four directions] is important in Khmer Buddhist iconography, signifying the establishment of the kingdom of the Buddha of the Future, Maitreya, who is often identified with the Buddha-king of Cambodia. The type of Buddhism practiced in medieval Cambodia has been widely studied by professor François Bizot and his colleagues at the École française d'Extrême-Orient. They have identified tantric and esoteric elements in this tradition and thus call it "Tantric Theravada".

After 1431 when the Cambodian kings permanently abandoned Angkor due to a Siamese invasion, the royal court was located on Udon Mountain, a few miles north of Phnom Penh. Siamese incursions from the west and Vietnamese invasions from the east weakened the Khmer Empire. The Vietnamese invaders attempted to suppress Theravada Buddhism and force the Khmer people to practice Mahayana Buddhism. The Siamese, on the other hand, would periodically invade Cambodia and attempt to drive out the "unbelievers" in an attempt to protect the Theravada religion. This power-struggle between the two ascendant powers continued until the arrival of the Europeans in the 16th century.

=== Colonial era ===
Buddhism continued to flourish in Cambodia in the sixteenth century. King Ang Chan (1516–1566), a relative of King Dhammaraja, was a devout Buddhist. He built pagodas in his capital and many Buddhist shrines in different parts of Cambodia. In order to popularize Buddhism, King Satha (1576–1549), son and successor of King Barom Reachea, restored the great towers of the Angkor Wat, which had become a Buddhist shrine by the sixteenth century.

Each successive wave of European influence was accompanied by Catholic missionaries, but Theravada Buddhism proved surprisingly resistant to foreign attempts to convert the Khmer people. During the colonial period, the peace was periodically breached by outbreaks of religiously motivated violence, including periodic millenarian revolts.

During the seventeenth, eighteenth, and nineteenth centuries, Thailand's involvement in Cambodian politics extended Thai influence into religious matters as well. On King Norodom's invitation, monks from the Thai Dhammayuttika Nikaya established a Dhammayuttika presence in Cambodia. The newly formed Thommayut order benefited from royal patronage, but frequently came into conflict with the existing Mohanikay (Maha Nikaya) lineage. The Thommayut were sometimes accused of holding loyalty to the Thai court, rather than to the Khmer nation.

During the era of French rule, convulsions of violence, led by Buddhist holy men, would periodically break out against the French. Significant advances were made in the education of Cambodian monks, both in specifically Buddhist topics and more general studies. Primary education of Cambodian children continued to take place at temple schools. Monks were also encouraged to become involved in community development projects.

=== Khmer Rouge era ===
In 1975 when the communist Khmer Rouge took control of Cambodia, they tried to completely destroy Buddhism and very nearly succeeded, when considering this religion as "reactionary". By the time of the Vietnamese invasion in 1979, nearly every monk and religious intellectual had been either murdered or driven into exile, and nearly every Buddhist temple and library had been destroyed.

The Khmer Rouge policies towards Buddhism—which included the forced disrobing of monks, the destruction of monasteries, and, ultimately, the execution of uncooperative monks—effectively destroyed Cambodia's Buddhist institutions. Monks who did not flee and avoided execution lived among the laity, sometimes secretly performing Buddhist rituals for the sick or afflicted.

Estimates of the number of monks in Cambodia prior to the ascension of the Khmer Rouge vary, ranging between 65,000 and 80,000. By the time of the Buddhist restoration in the early-1980s, the number of Cambodian monks worldwide was estimated to be fewer than 3,000. The patriarchs of both Cambodian nikayas perished sometime during the period 1975–1978, though the cause of their deaths is not known.

Due to their association with the Thai monarchy, monks of the Thommayut order may have been singled out for persecution.

=== Post-Khmer Rouge era ===
Following the defeat of the Khmer Rouge by Vietnamese forces, Buddhism initially remained officially suppressed in Cambodia. Following challenges to the legitimacy of the Vietnamese-backed People's Republic of Kampuchea, policies towards Buddhism began to ease starting in the summer of 1979. A group of monks who had been exiled and re-ordained in Vietnam during the Khmer Rouge period were sent to Cambodia, and in 1981 one of their number, Venerable Tep Vong, was elected the first sangharaja of a new unified Cambodia sangha, officially abolishing the division between the Thommayut order and the Mohanikay. The ordination of new monks was sponsored by the government as a public show of piety and lifted restrictions on ordination.

Following the withdrawal of the Vietnamese military, the newly renamed Cambodian People's Party sought to align itself with the Buddhist sangha, declaring Buddhism to be Cambodia's "state religion" in a 1991 policy statement. In 1991, King Sihanouk returned from exile and appointed a new sangharaja for each of the Thommayut and Mohanikay orders, effectively marking the end of the unified system created under Vietnamese rule in 1981.

== The Cambodian sangha ==
Since 1855, the Buddhist monastic community in Cambodia has been split into two divisions, excepting a brief period of unification between 1981 and 1991: the Maha Nikaya and the Dhammayuttika Nikaya. The Maha Nikaya is by far the larger of the two monastic fraternities, claiming the allegiance of a large majority of Cambodian monks. The Dhammayuttika Nikaya, despite royal patronage, remains a small minority, isolated somewhat by its strict discipline and connection with Thailand.

The Maha Nikaya monastic hierarchy—headed by the sanghreach (sangharaja)—has been closely connected with the Cambodian government since its re-establishment in the early-1980s High-ranking officials of the Maha Nikaya have often spoken out against criticism of the government and in favor of government policies, including calling for the arrest of monks espousing opposition positions. Officials from the Maha Nikaya hierarchy appoint members to lay committees to oversee the running of temples, who also act to ensure that temples do not become organizing points for anti-government activity by monks or lay supporters Nevertheless, divisions within the Maha Nikaya fraternity do exist.

=== Modernists and traditionalists ===
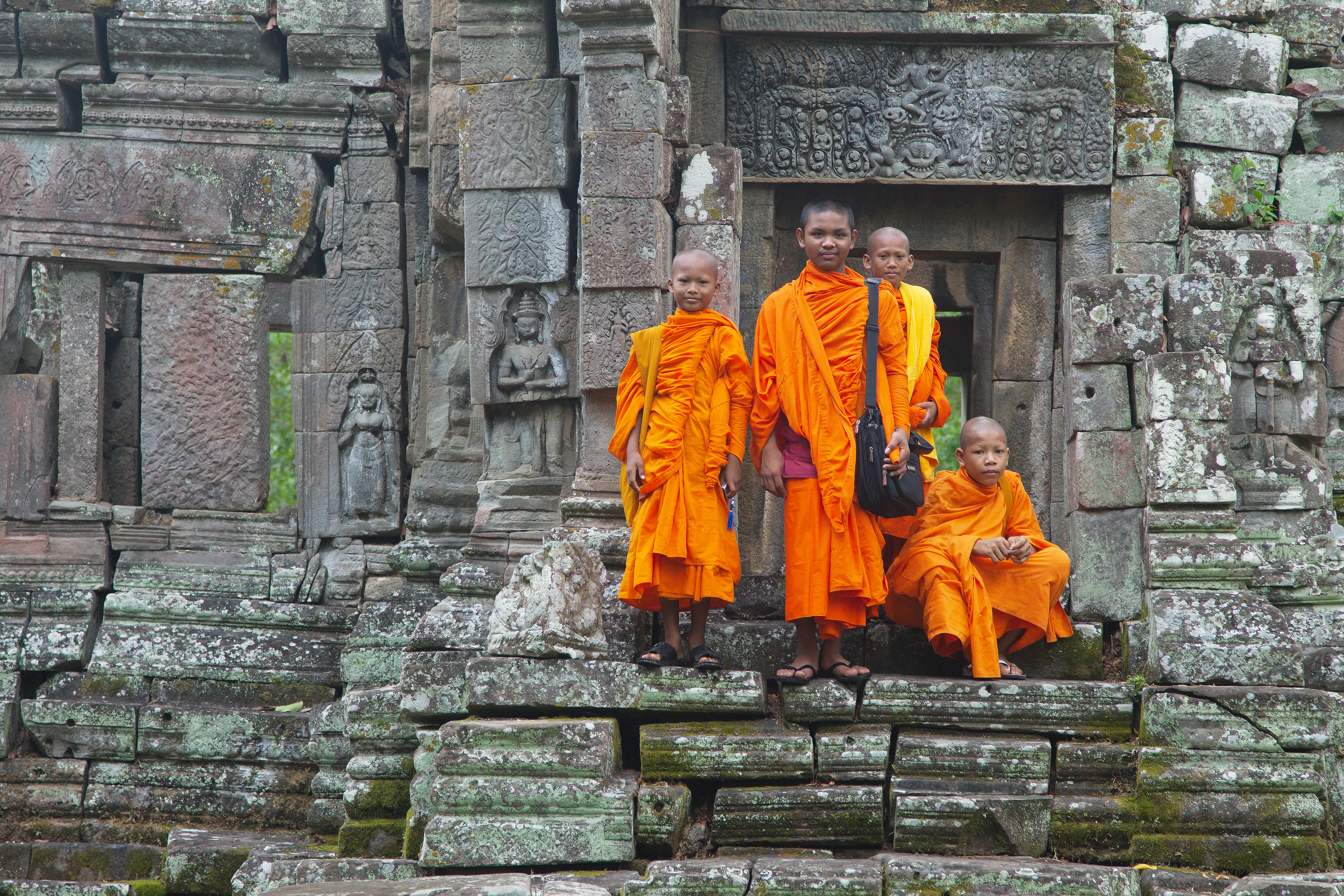
Adolescent monks in Cambodia

Divisions within the sangha between "modernists" and "traditionalists" were recorded in Cambodia as early as 1918. Broadly speaking, "modernists" have attempted to respond to Western criticism of Buddhist institutions by re-interpreting Buddhist teachings—particularly those related to philosophy and meditation—in light of both modern secular knowledge and the textual source of Theravada teachings, the Pali Canon. "Traditionalists", on the other hand, prefer to stick to the practices and teachings handed down through the monastic oral tradition, which have traditionally centered on the performance of merit-making ceremonies and the attainment of "heightened states" through concentration meditation. Traditionalists have tended to reject modern interest in vipassana meditation as a foreign affectation, and have focused on the rote memorization and recitation of Pali passages rather than attempts to study, translate, and interpret the contents of the Pali tripitaka.

For many years, Maha Ghosananda remained the most visible and recognizable figure of the Maha Nikaya modernists. Through his Dhammayatra program and other attempts to use the influence of the sangha to effect social change in Cambodian society, Maha Ghosananda brought to Cambodia a form of Engaged Buddhism not previously seen among Cambodian religious institutions. This form of modernist, engaged Buddhism has proved very popular with Western Buddhists and NGOs, who have lent their support and funding to efforts by Maha Ghosananda and other modernist leaders.

High officials of the Cambodian government, by contrast, have tended to support the most conservative of the Maha Nikaya monks, particular the members of a segment known as the boran, an ultra-conservative movement that touts the worldly efficacy of the rote recitation of various Pali and Khmer prayers and discourses. Monks in the boran movement do not typically possess a significant knowledge of Pali, instead focusing on the rote memorization and recitation of certain verses and scriptures considered powerful. Boran monks maintain that by sponsoring recitations of these verses, lay supporters can accrue great merit that will result in immediate, worldly benefits, such as financial or career success. A large number of senior Cambodian officials (including Hun Sen) have patronized boran temples, providing for extensive expansions and rich decoration of the most popular temples. Boran monks also teach the efficacy of "group repentance" rituals, where, through the recitation of Pali texts, the karmic fruit of earlier misdeeds can be avoided or moderated. These rituals, which developed from New Years repentance ceremonies, have become very popular among certain segments of Cambodian society, and were conducted by the previous Maha Nikaya sangharaja, Tep Vong.

The Dhammayuttika order in Cambodia seems to occupy a middle position between the Maha Nikaya modernists and traditionalists. Like the Dhammayuttika order in Thailand, they place a higher premium on scriptural study and knowledge of the Pali language than the monks of the traditionalist camp. At the same time, they have not embraced the modernist, engaged notion of monks as agents of social development, preferring instead to stick closely to traditional monastic roles of study, meditation, and providing merit-making opportunities for lay supporters.

=== "Young Monks" movement ===
Another division in the Cambodian sangha can be seen in what has been called the "young monks" movement, a small group of politically active monks (primarily Maha Nikaya) voicing public opposition to the current government. The "young monks" are primarily junior members of the clergy, drawn from temples in and around Phnom Penh. Unlike the engaged modernists, their interest is not in using the authority of the sangha to aide social development programs, but rather to express direct opposition to government policies and corruption. Since the 1993 UN-monitored elections, monks have been permitted to vote in Cambodia (a move opposed by some senior monks). While this has not resulted in any large-scale mobilization of the sangha as a political force, it has drawn some young monks farther into participation in parliamentary politics. Many of these young monks are associated with opposition figure Sam Rainsy and his political party, the SRP.

Members of the young monks movement have participated in and organized public demonstrations in Phnom Penh, aimed at drawing attention to perceived government misdeeds. The Maha Nikaya hierarchy has condemned this form of political activism, calling for the arrest of some monks and defrocking others.

== Khmer nationalism and Buddhism ==
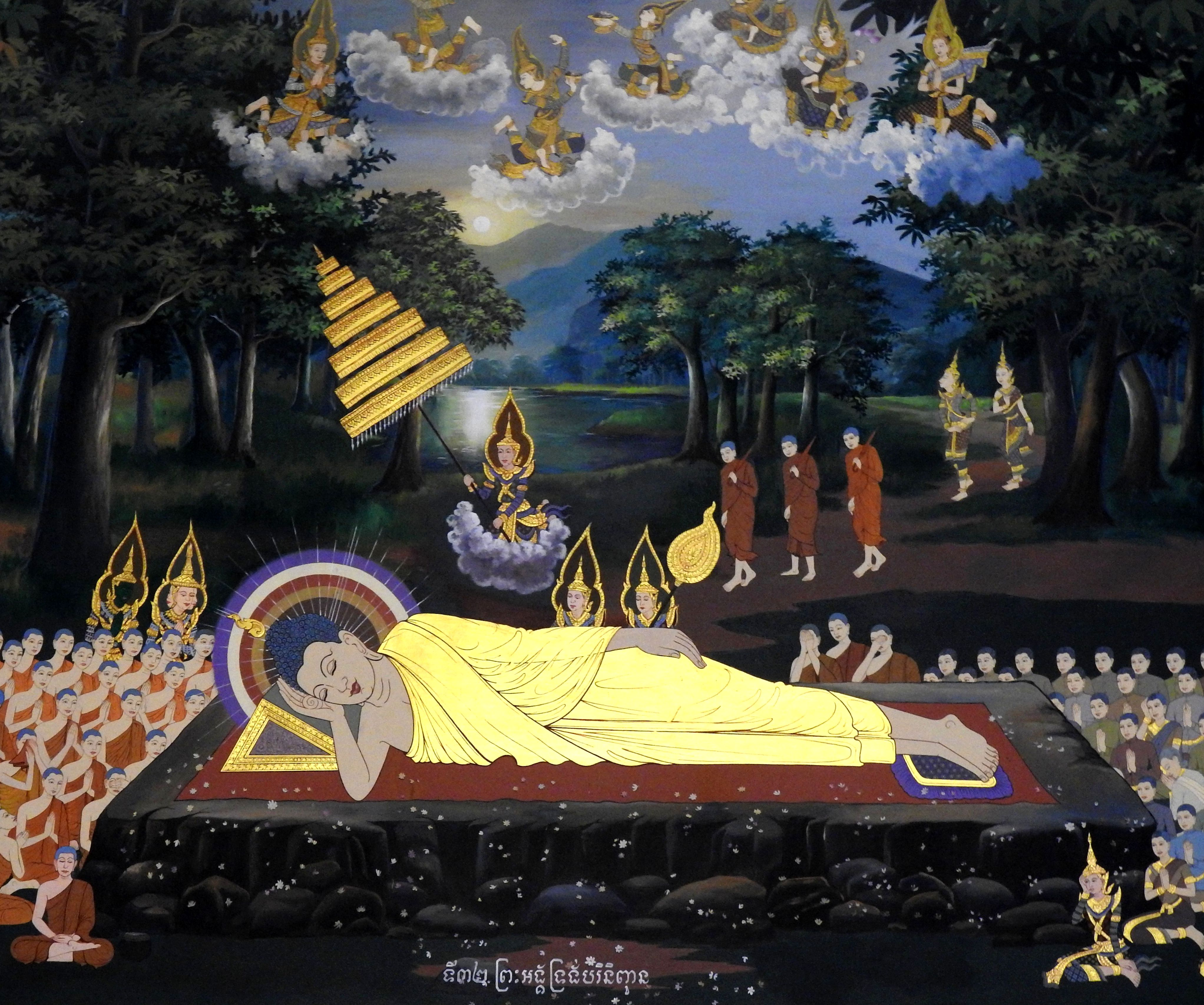
Mural painting depicting Gautama Buddha at Wat Botum

Cambodian Buddhism helped foment Khmer national identity and the independence movement in the 20th century, leading to Cambodian independence as a sovereign state.

In their attempt to separate the Khmer people from their cultural allegiance to the neighboring Theravada Kingdom of Siam, the French encouraged a sense of Khmer identity by emphasizing Khmer-language studies and Khmer Buddhist studies. They established Pali schools within Cambodia to keep the Cambodian monks from traveling to Siam for higher education. These Khmer language study centers became the birthplace of Cambodian nationalism.

== Cambodian adaptations ==
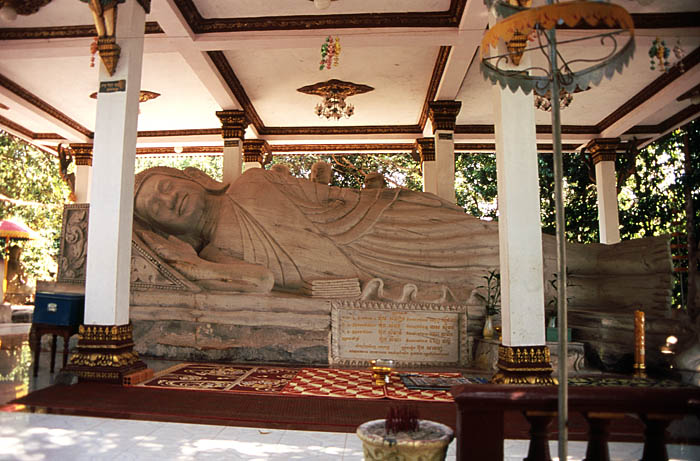
Buddha at a temple in Ream, Cambodia

Cambodian Buddhism has no formal administrative ties with other Buddhist bodies, although Theravada monks from other countries, especially Thailand, Laos, Myanmar, and Sri Lanka, may participate in religious ceremonies in order to make up the requisite number of clergy. Cambodian Buddhism is organized nationally in accordance with regulations formulated in 1943 and modified in 1948. During the monarchical period, the king led the Buddhist clergy. Prince Sihanouk continued in this role even after he had abdicated and was governing as head of state. He appointed both the heads of the monastic orders and other high-ranking clergy. After the overthrow of Sihanouk in 1970, the new head of state, Lon Nol, appointed these leaders.

Two monastic orders constituted the clergy in Cambodia. The larger group, to which more than 90 percent of the clergy belonged, was the Mohanikay. The Thommayut order was far smaller. The Thommayut was introduced into the ruling circles of Cambodia from Thailand in 1864; it gained prestige because of its adoption by royalty and by the aristocracy, but its adherents were confined geographically to the Phnom Penh area. Among the few differences between the two orders is stricter observance by the Thommayut bhikkhus (monks) of the rules governing the clergy. In 1961 the Mohanikay had more than 52,000 ordained monks in some 2,700 wats, whereas the Thommayut order had 1,460 monks in just over 100 wats. In 1967 more than 2,800 Mohanikay wats and 320 Thommayut wats were in existence in Cambodia. After Phnom Penh, the largest number of Thommayut wats were found in Batdambang, Stoeng Treng, Prey Veng, Kampot, and Kampong Thum provinces.

Each order has its own superior and is organized into a hierarchy of eleven levels. The seven lower levels are known collectively as the thananukram; the four higher levels together are called the rajagana. The Mohanikay order has thirty-five monks in the rajagana; the Thommayut has twenty-one. Each monk must serve for at least twenty years to be named to these highest levels.

The cornerstones of Cambodian Buddhism are the Buddhist bhikkhu and the wat. Traditionally, each village has a spiritual center, a wat, where from five to more than seventy bhikkhus reside. A typical wat in rural Cambodia consists of a walled enclosure containing a sanctuary, several residences for bhikkhus, a hall, a kitchen, quarters for nuns, and a pond. The number of monks varies according to the size of the local population. The sanctuary, which contains an altar with statues of the Buddha and, in rare cases, a religious relic, is reserved for major ceremonies and usually only for the use of bhikkhus. Other ceremonies, classes for monks and for laity, and meals take place in the hall. Stupas containing the ashes of extended family members are constructed near the sanctuary. Fruit trees and vegetable gardens tended by local children are also part of the local wat. The main entrance, usually only for ceremonial use, faces east; other entrances are at other points around the wall. There are no gates.

Steinberg notes the striking ratio of bhikkhus to the total population of Cambodia. In the late-1950s, an estimated 100,000 bhikkhus (including about 40,000 novices) served a population of about five million. This high proportion undoubtedly was caused in large part by the ease with which one could enter and leave the sangha. Becoming a bhikkhu and leaving the sangha are matters of individual choice although, in theory, nearly all Cambodian males over sixteen serve terms as bhikkhus. Most young men do not intend to become fully ordained bhikkhus (bhikkhu), and they remain as monks for less than a year. Even a son's temporary ordination as a bhikkhu brings great merit to his parents, however, and is considered so important that arrangements are made at a parent's funeral if the son has not undergone the process while the parent was living. There are two classes of bhikkhus at a wat: the novices (samani or nen) and the bhikkhu. Ordination is held from mid-April to mid-July, during the rainy season.

Buddhist monks do not take perpetual vows to remain monks although some become monks permanently. Traditionally, they became monks early in life. It is possible to become a novice at age seven, but in practice thirteen is the earliest age for novices. A bhikkhu must be at least twenty. The monk's life is regulated by Buddhist law, and life in the wat adheres to a rigid routine. A bhikkhu follows 227 rules of monastic discipline as well as the 10 basic precepts. These include the five precepts that all Buddhists should follow. The five precepts for monastic asceticism prohibit eating after noon, participating in any entertainment (singing, dancing, and watching movies or television), using any personal adornments, sleeping on a luxurious bed, and handling money. In addition, a monk also is expected to be celibate. Furthermore, monks supposedly avoid all involvement in political affairs. They are not eligible to vote or to hold any political office, and they may not witness a legal document or give testimony in court. Since the person of a monk is considered sacred, he is considered to be outside the normal civil laws and public duties that affect lay people. Some of these practices have changed in the modern period, however, and in the 1980s Buddhist monks have been active even in the PRK government.

Women are not ordained, but older women, especially widows, can become nuns. They live in wat and play an important role in the everyday life of the temple. Nuns shave their heads and eyebrows and generally follow the same precepts as monks. They may prepare the altars and do some of the housekeeping chores.

== Role of Buddhism in Cambodian life ==
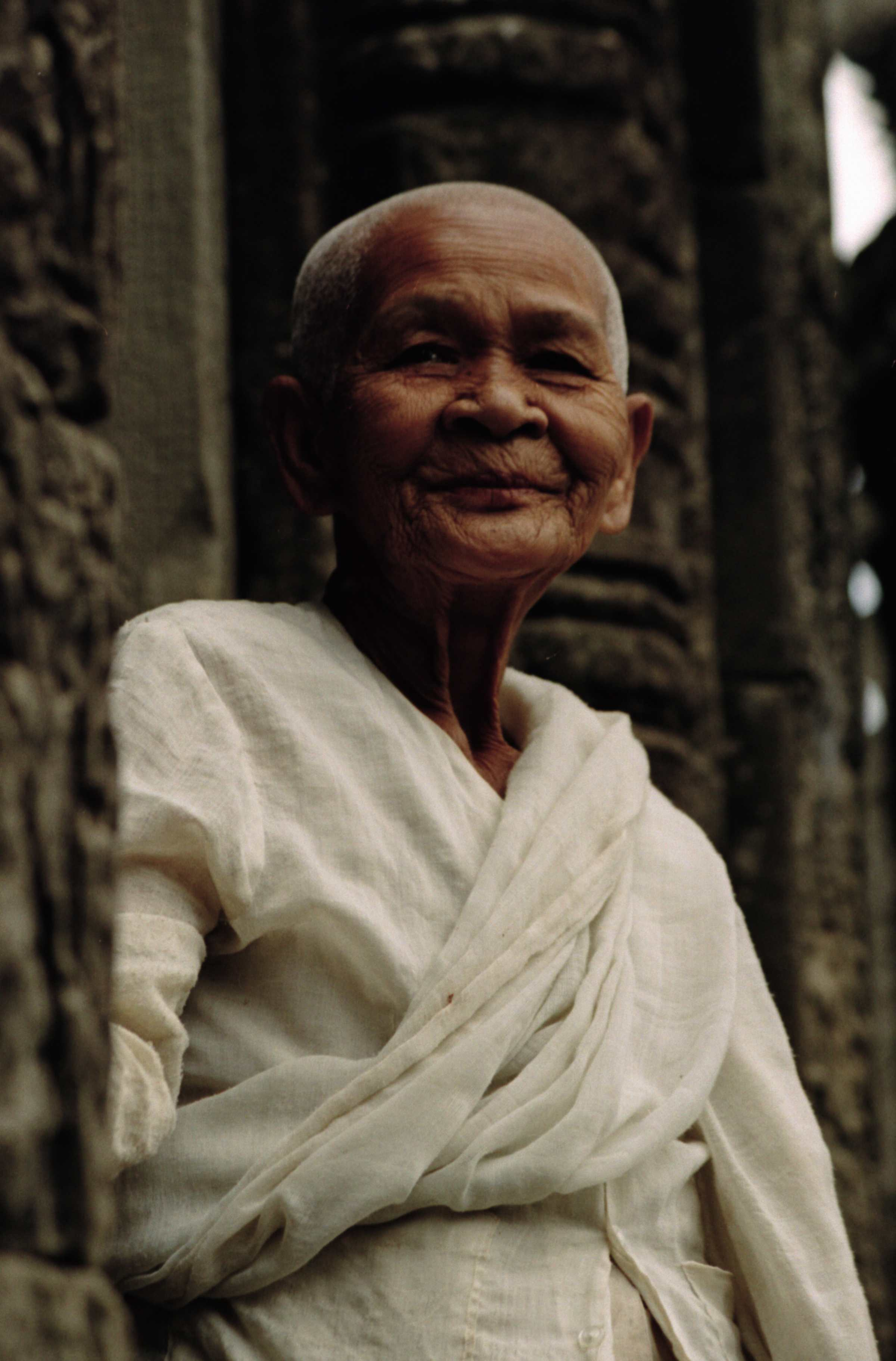
Khmer donchee. Bayon Temple, Angkor Wat, Siem Reap, Cambodia (January 2005).

Buddhist monks traditionally were called upon to perform a number of functions in Cambodian life. They participated in all formal village festivals, ceremonies, marriages, and funerals. They also might have participated in ceremonies to name infants and in other minor ceremonies or rites of passage. Monks did not lead the ceremonies, however, because that role was given to the achar, or master of ceremonies; the monk's major function was to say prayers of blessing. They were often healers and, in traditional Khmer culture, they were the practitioners whose role was closest to that of modern psychiatrists. They might also have been skilled in astrology. The monk traditionally occupied a unique position in the transmission of Khmer culture and values. By his way of life, he provided a living model of the most meritorious behavior a Buddhist could follow. He also provided the laity with many opportunities for gaining merit. For centuries monks were the only literate people residing in rural communities; they acted as teachers to temple servants, to novices, and to newly ordained monks. Until the 1970s, most literate Cambodian males gained literacy solely through the instruction of the sangha.

After independence from France, young Cambodian intellectuals changed their attitude toward the clergy. In describing a general shift away from Buddhism in the late-1950s and early-1960s, Vickery cites the early work of anthropologist May Mayko Ebihara and his own observations. He suggests that the Khmer Rouge was able to instill antireligious feelings in younger males because the latter were losing interest in becoming monks even during their teenage years, the traditional temporary period of service. The monks themselves had abandoned some of their traditional restrictions and had become involved in politics. At intervals during the colonial period, some monks had demonstrated or had rebelled against French rule, and in the 1970s monks joined pro- government demonstrations against the communists. Anticlerical feelings reached their highest point among the Khmer Rouge, who at first attempted to indoctrinate monks and to force them to pass anticlerical ideas on to the laity. Under the Khmer Rouge regime, monks were expelled forcibly from the wats and were compelled to do manual labor. Article 20 of the 1976 Constitution of Democratic Kampuchea permitted freedom of religion but banned all reactionary religions, that were "detrimental to the country". The minister of culture stated that Buddhism was incompatible with the revolution and was an instrument of exploitation. Under this regime, to quote the Finnish Inquiry Commission, "The practice of religion was forbidden and the pagodas were systematically destroyed." Observers estimated that 50,000 monks died during the Khmer Rouge regime. The status of Buddhism and of religion in general after the Vietnamese invasion was at least partially similar to its status in pre-Khmer Rouge times.

According to Michael Vickery, who has written positively about the People's Republic of Kampuchea, public observance of Buddhism and of Islam was reestablished, and government policies allowed Cambodians freedom to believe or not to believe in Buddhism. Vickery cites some differences in this reestablished Buddhism: religious affairs were overseen by the PRK's Kampuchean (or Khmer) United Front for National Construction and Defense (KUFNCD), the mass organization that supported the state by organizing women, youths, workers, and religious groups. In 1987 there was only a single Buddhist order because the Thommayut order had not been revived. The organization of the clergy also had been simplified. The sangharaja (primate of the Buddhist clergy) had been replaced by a prathean (chairman). Communities that wanted wats had to apply to a local front committee for permission. The wat were administered by a committee of the local laity. Private funds paid for the restoration of the wats damaged during the war and the Khmer Rouge era, and they supported the restored wats. Monks were ordained by a hierarchy that has been reconstituted since an initial ordination in September 1979 by a delegation from the Buddhist community in Vietnam. The validity of this ordination continued to be questioned. In general, there are only two to four monks per wat, which is fewer than before 1975. In 1981 about 4,930 monks served in 740 wats in Cambodia. The Buddhist General Assembly reported 7,000 monks in 1,821 active wats a year later. In 1969 by contrast, observers estimated that 53,400 monks and 40,000 novice monks served in more than 3,000 wats. Vickery sums up his observations on the subject by noting that, "The government has kept its promise to allow freedom for traditional Buddhism, but does not actively encourage it."

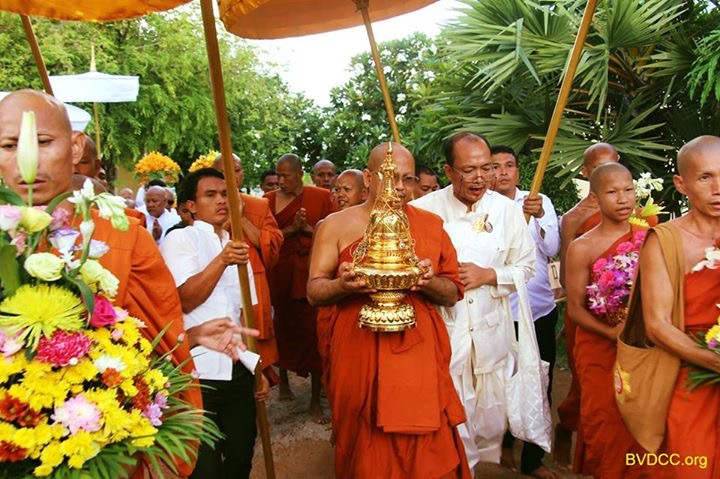
Visak Bochea commemorates the birth, enlightenment and passing of the Buddha.

Martin offers another, more pessimistic, view of the religious situation in the late-1980s. In a 1986 study, she asserts that the PRK showed outsiders only certain aspects of religious freedom; she also states that the few wats that were restored had only two or three old monks in residence and that public attendance was low. The monks were allowed to leave the wats only for an hour in the mornings, to collect their food, or during holy days. Lay people who practiced their faith were about the same ages as the monks, and they were allowed to visit the wats only in the evenings. A government circular had also instructed civil servants to stop celebrating the traditional New Year Festival. Some traditional Buddhist festivals still were tolerated, but the state collected a 50 percent tax on donations. Martin believes that Buddhism was threatened externally by state repression and by nonsupport and internally by invalid clergy. She noted that the two Buddhist superiors, Venerable Long Chhim and Venerable Tep Vong, were both believed to be from Vietnam. Venerable Tep Vong was concurrently the superior of the Buddhist clergy, vice president of the PRK's Khmer National Assembly, and vice president of the KUFNCD National Council. She quoted a refugee from Batdambang as having said, "During the meetings, the Khmer administrative authorities, accompanied by the Vietnamese experts, tell you, `Religion is like poison, it's like opium; it's better to give the money to the military, so they can fight'."

Buddhism is still strong among the various Cambodian refugee groups throughout the world, although some younger monks, faced with the distractions of a foreign culture, have chosen to leave the clergy and have become laicized. In the United States in 1984, there were twelve Cambodian wats with about twenty-one monks. In the 1980s, a Cambodian Buddhist wat was constructed near Washington, D.C., financed by a massive outpouring of donations from Cambodian Buddhists throughout North America. This wat is one of the few outside Southeast Asia that has the consecrated boundary within which ordinations may be performed.

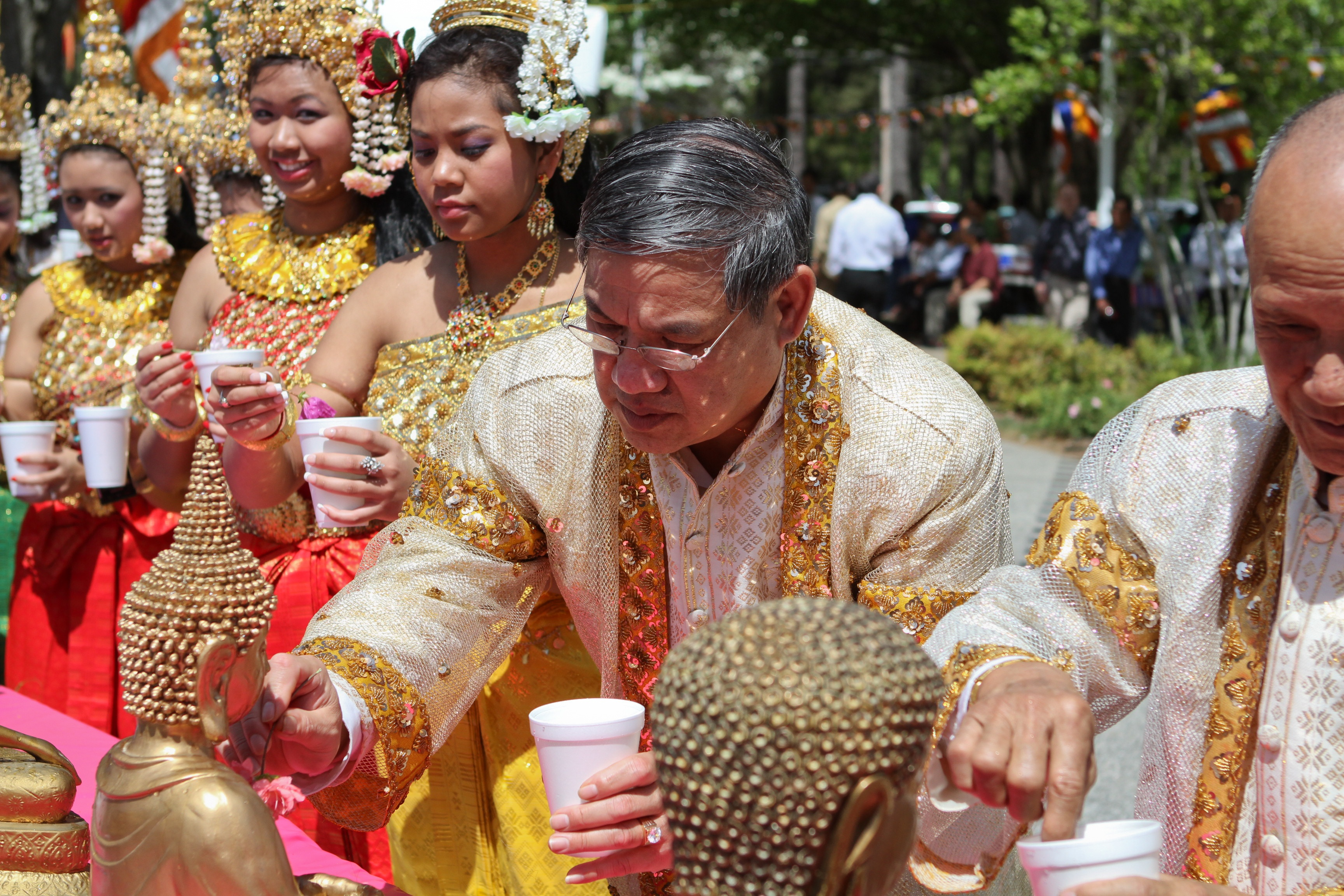

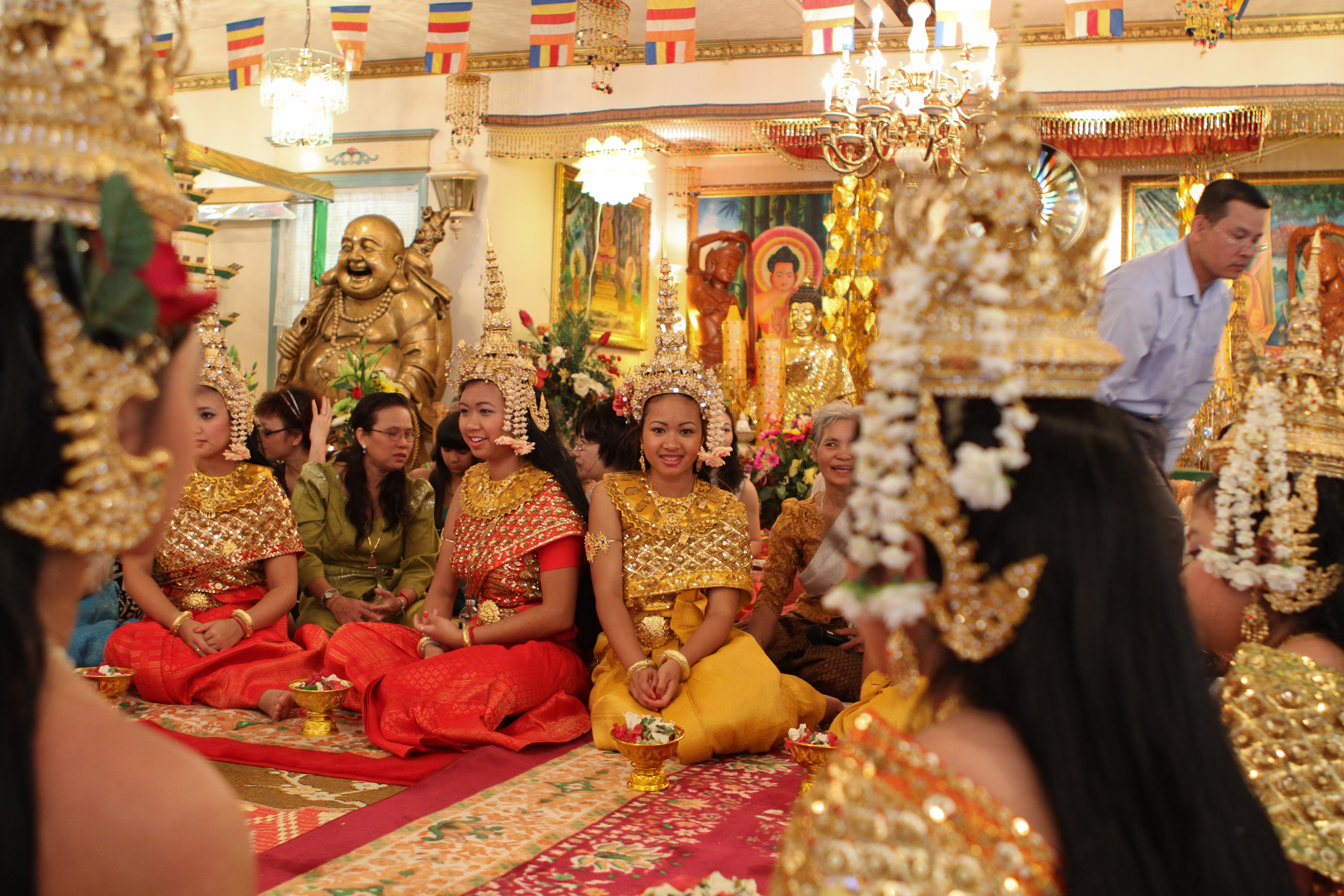
Cambodian New Year celebrations

Most of the major Cambodian annual festivals are connected with Buddhist observances. The chol chnam (New Year Festival) takes place in mid-April; it was one of the few festivals allowed under the Khmer Rouge regime. Pchum Ben, celebrated in September or in October, is a memorial day for deceased ancestors and for close friends. Meak bochea, in January or February, commemorates the last sermon of the Buddha. Vissakh bochea, in April or in May, is the triple anniversary of the birth, death, and enlightenment of the Buddha. The chol vossa takes place in June or in July; it marks the beginning of a penitential season during which the monks must remain within the temple compounds. The kathen marks the end of this season; celebrated in September, it features offerings, especially of robes, to the monks. The kathen was still celebrated in the PRK in the late 1980s.

Cambodian Buddhism exists side-by-side with, and to some extent intermingles with, pre-Buddhist animism and Brahman practices. Most Cambodians, whether or not they profess to be Buddhists (or Muslims), believe in a rich supernatural world. When ill, or at other times of crisis, or to seek supernatural help, Cambodians may enlist the aid of a practitioner who is believed to be able to propitiate or obtain help from various spirits. Local spirits are believed to inhabit a variety of objects, and shrines to them may be found in houses, in Buddhist temples, along roads, and in forests.

Several types of supernatural entities are believed to exist; they make themselves known by means of inexplicable sounds or happenings. Among these phenomena are khmaoc (ghosts), pret and besach (particularly nasty demons, the spirits of people who have died violent, untimely, or unnatural deaths), arak (evil spirits, usually female), neak ta (tutelary spirits residing in inanimate objects), mneang phteah (guardians of the house), meba (ancestral spirits), and mrenh kongveal (elf-like guardians of animals). All spirits must be shown proper respect, and, with the exception of the mneang phteah and mrenh kongveal, they can cause trouble ranging from mischief to serious life-threatening illnesses. An important way for living people to show respect for the spirits of the dead is to provide food for the spirits. If this food is not provided, the spirit can cause trouble for the offending person. For example, if a child does not provide food for the spirit of its dead mother, that spirit can cause misfortunes to happen to the child.

Aid in dealing with the spirit world may be obtained from a kru (shaman or spirit practitioner), an achar (ritualist), thmup (witch, sorcerer or sorceress), or a rup arak (medium, usually male). The kru is a kind of sorcerer who prepares charms and amulets to protect the wearer from harm. He can cure illnesses, find lost objects, and prepare magic potions. Traditionally, Cambodians have held strong beliefs about protective charms. Amulets are worn routinely by soldiers to ward off bullets, for example. The kru are believed to have the power to prepare an amulet and to establish a supernatural link between it and the owner. A kru may acquire considerable local prestige and power. Many kru are former Buddhist monks.

Another kind of magical practitioner is the achar, a specialist in ritual. He may function as a kind of master of ceremonies at a wat and as a specialist in conducting spirit worship rituals connected with life-cycle ceremonies. Rup arak are mediums who can be possessed by supernatural beings and communicate with the spirit world. The thmup are sorcerers who cause illnesses.

Fortunetellers and astrologers—haor teay—are important in Cambodian life. They are consulted about important decisions such as marriages, building a new house, or going on a long journey. They are believed to be able to foretell future events and to determine lucky or unlucky days for various activities.

Villagers are sensitive to the power and to the needs of the spirit world. According to observations by an American missionary in the early 1970s, villagers consulted the local guardian spirit to find out what the coming year would bring, a new province chief held a ceremony to ask the protection of the spirits over the province, and soldiers obtained magic cloths and amulets from mediums and shamans to protect them from the bullets of the enemy. Before embarking on a mission against enemy forces, a province chief might burn incense and call on a spirit for aid in defeating the enemy. Examples of Brahman influences were various rituals concerned with the well-being of the nation carried out by the ruler and the baku (a Brahman priestly group attached to the royal court). These rituals were reportedly stopped after Sihanouk's ouster in 1970 (see The March 1970 Coup d'État, ch. 1).

== See also ==
- Pāli Canon
- Mangala Sutta
- Metta Sutta
- Ratana Sutta
- Samatha
- Vipassanā
- Buddhist Institute, Cambodia
- Supreme Patriarch of Cambodia
- Choun Nath
- Preah Maha Ghosananda
- Tep Vong
- Bour Kry
- Pchum Ben
- Dhammayietra
- Smot (chanting)

== Sources ==
- Bapat, P.V.; Takasaki, J.N. (1959), "Progress of Buddhist Studies in Ceylon, Burma, Thailand, Cambodia, Laos, Vietnam, China and Japan", in Bapat, V.P. (ed.), 2500 Years of Buddhism, Delhi: Ministry of Information and Broadcasting, Government of India, pp. 370–83
- Rawson, Philip (1990), The Art of Southeast Asia, Thames & Hudson, ISBN 0-500-20060-2
- Harris, Ian (August 2001), "Sangha Groupings in Cambodia", Buddhist Studies Review, 18 (I), UK Association for Buddhist Studies: 73–106, doi:10.1558/bsrv.v18i1.14469, S2CID 247890925
- Rajavaramuni, Phra Prayudh Payutto (1984), "A Doubtful Fate of Laotian and Cambodian Buddhism", Thai Buddhism in the Buddhist World, Bangkok: Mahachulalongkorn Buddhist University, pp. 78–82
- Université Buddhique Preah Sihanouk Raj; Chau Séng (ed.); Organisation buddhique au Cambodge; Phnom Penh [1961]
