= Royal Council of the Throne =

Cambodian council in charge of selecting the next monarch

Royal Standard of the King

The Royal Council of the Throne (Khmer: ក្រុមប្រឹក្សារាជបល្ល័ង្ក, Krŏm Prœ̆ksa Réachôbâlleăngk [krom prəksaː riəceaʔɓallaŋ]) is a nine-member council of Cambodia responsible for selecting the Cambodian monarch. It was established by the constitution on 24 September 1993. The Council elects the king for life from among male descendants of King Ang Duong who are at least 30 years old, from the two royal houses of Cambodia (the House of Norodom and the House of Sisowath). The nine members of the council include the Prime Minister, President of the National Assembly, President of the Senate, First and Second Vice Presidents of the National Assembly, First and Second Vice Presidents of the Senate, and the two heads of the order of Moha Nikay and Thommoyutteka Nikay (Non Nget and Bour Kry). The council was active only in September 1993, when it reinstated Norodom Sihanouk on the throne, and October 2004, when it named his son Norodom Sihamoni as the new king. The voting is conducted through a secret ballot of the nine members.

== Current members ==
Name	Position
Hun Manet	Prime Minister of Cambodia
Khuon Sudary	President of the National Assembly
Hun Sen	President of the Senate
Cheam Yeab	First Vice President of the National Assembly
Vong Soth	Second Vice President of the National Assembly
Ouch Borith	First Vice President of the Senate
Thun Vathana	Second Vice President of the Senate
Non Nget	Supreme Patriarch of the Moha Nikay Order
Bour Kry	Supreme Patriarch of the Thommoyutteka Nikay Order

== List of monarchs elected ==
Portrait	Name	Elected	Ref.
	Norodom Sihanouk នរោត្តម សីហនុ (b. 1922 – d. 2012)	24 September 1993	
	Norodom Sihamoni នរោត្តម សីហមុនី (b. 1953)	14 October 2004	

== See also ==
- Accession Council
- Allegiance Council
