= Preah Maha Ghosananda =

Cambodian Buddhist monk (1913/1924–2007)

His Holiness Samdech Preah Mahāghosānanda
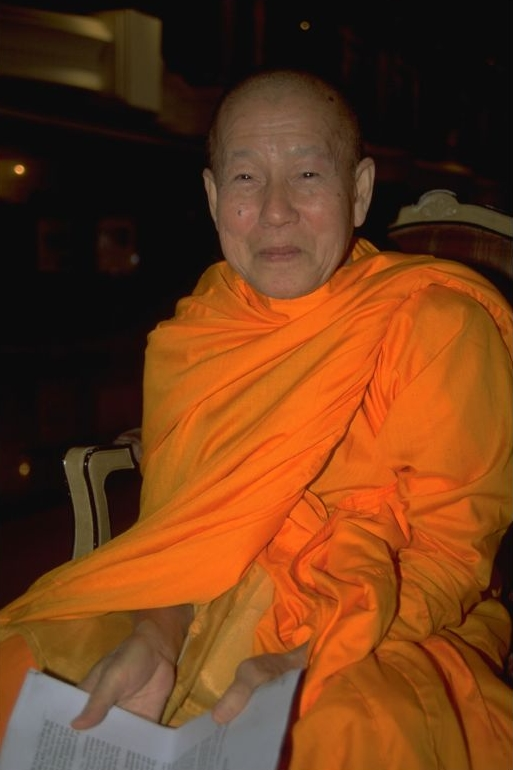
- Born: Maha Ghosananda; May 23, 1913; Treang, Takéo, Cambodia
- Died: March 12, 2007 (aged 93); Northampton, Massachusetts, United States
- Occupation: Supreme Patriarch of Cambodia (1988–2007)
- Years active: 1934–2007

Maha Ghosananda (full title Samdech Preah Maha Ghosananda, Khmer: សម្តេចព្រះមហាឃោសានន្ទ, romanized: Sǎmdăch Preăh Môha Khosanǒn; Pali: Mahāghosānanda; May 23, 1913 or, more likely, around 1924 – March 12, 2007) (Note: Biographies sometime state that Maha Ghosananda was born around 1922- this date may have been assigned later when Maha Goshananda applied for school in India. See (Harris 2005, pg. 207).) was a highly revered Cambodian Buddhist monk in the Theravada tradition, who served as the Patriarch (Sangharaja) of Cambodian Buddhism during the Khmer Rouge period and post-communist transition period of Cambodian history. His Pali monastic name, 'Mahā Ghosānanda', means "great joyful proclaimer". He was well known in Cambodia for his annual peace marches.

== Early life and education ==
He was born Va Yav in Takéo Province, Cambodia in 1913 to a farming family in the Mekong Delta plains. From an early age he showed great interest in religion, and began to serve as a temple boy at the age of eight years old. He was greatly impressed by the monks with whom he served, and at age fourteen received novice ordination. He studied Pali scriptures in the local temple high school, then went on to complete his higher education at the monastic universities in Phnom Penh and Battambang.

He was sponsored by Chuon Nath to travel to India to pursue a doctorate in Pali at Nalanda University in Bihar, at that time an institute known under the name of Nava Nālandā Mahāvihāra. While in India, he studied under the Japanese monk Nichidatsu Fujii, founder of the Japanese peace-oriented sect Nipponzan Myohoji and a former associate of Mahatma Gandhi.

In 1965, Maha Ghosananda left India to study meditation under Ajahn Dhammadaro (Note: Not Ajahn Lee Dhammadaro, who died in 1961), a famous meditation master of the Thai Forest Tradition. He remained with Ajahn Dhammadaro at his forest hermitage in southern Thailand, Wat Chai Na (located near Nakhon Si Thammarat), for eleven years.

== Khmer Rouge era ==
The Khmer Rouge worked to eliminate Buddhism in Cambodia. The regime murdered or drove into exile, nearly all monks and religious figures and destroyed most temples and libraries. During his time in retreat, Ghosananda learned about the Khmer Rouge's mass killings. Ghosananda was troubled and returned to Cambodia. Dhammadaro counseled him that maintaining inner peace amid Cambodia's chaos would be the true road to mastering himself.

After Vietnamese troops drove out the Khmer Rouge in 1978 by invading Cambodia, waves of refugees poured into Thai border camps. Ghosananda began his work of social engagement, setting up modest makeshift temples in each of the camps. Notably, in 1978 he traveled to the refugee camps near the Thai-Cambodian border to begin ministering to the first refugees who filtered across the border. Ghosananda announced a gathering, and over ten-thousand refugees attended the ceremony. At the gathering, Ghosananda repeated a verse from the verse from the Dhammapada, "Hatred never ceases by hatred; But by love alone is healed. This is an ancient and eternal law.". This was a verse familiar to the refugees, many of whom joined the chant. Together with a committed circle of activists, Ghosananda initiated numerous relief efforts within the camps, inside Cambodia, and across Cambodian communities abroad. He also sold a ticket to France he had been gifted, and used the money to print 40,000 leaflets of the Metta Sutta, with Buddha’s discourse on lovingkindness, which he distributed throughout the camps.

When the Khmer Rouge regime collapsed in 1979, Maha Ghosananda was one of only 3,000 Cambodian Buddhist monks alive, out of more than 60,000 at the start of the reign of terror in 1976. Throughout 1979 Maha Ghosananda established wats in refugee camps along the Thai-Cambodian border, ordaining monks against the orders of the Thai military. He also founded more than 50 temples for Cambodian refugees living in Canada and the United States.

When Thai authorities started forcing refugees to return to Cambodia, Ghosananda distributed flyers letting them know they had the right to refuse and opened his temple as a refuge for anyone seeking shelter. Thai officials viewed this as crossing a line and barred him from entering the camps, which is what brought him to the United States.

== Restoration ==
Maha Ghosananda served as a key figure in post-Communist Cambodia, helping to restore the nation state and to revive Cambodian Buddhism. In 1980, he served as a representative of the Cambodian nation-in-exile to the United Nations.

In 1980 Maha Ghosananda and the Reverend Peter L. Pond formed the Inter-Religious Mission for Peace in Cambodia. Together they located hundreds of surviving monks and nuns in Cambodia so that they could renew their vows and take leadership roles in Cambodian temples around the world. In June 1980 the Thai Government decided to forcibly repatriate thousands of refugees. Pond and the Preah Maha Ghosananda organized a protest against the forced repatriation of refugees from Sa Kaeo Refugee Camp.

In 1988, Maha Ghosananda was elected as sanghreach (sangharaja) by a small gathering of exiled monks in Paris. He agreed to accept the position provisionally, until a complete, independent monastic hierarchy could be established in Cambodia. At the time, Venerable Tep Vong was the titular head of a unified Cambodian sangha, having been appointed to the position in 1981 by the Vietnamese-backed People's Republic of Kampuchea.

Fellow monks elected him a Supreme Cambodian Buddhist Patriarch 1988. In 1989, he returned full-time to Cambodia, taking up residence at Wat Sampeou Meas in Phnom Penh. In the late 1980s Ghosananda moved to Leverett Massachusetts in the United States at the invitation of local monks.

== Dhammayietra ==
In 1992, during the first year of the United Nations sponsored peace agreement, Maha Ghosananda led the first nationwide Dhammayietra, a peace march or pilgrimage, across Cambodia in an effort to begin restoring the hope and spirit of the Cambodian people. In 1992 he also published a book titled Step by Step.

The 16-day, 125-mile peace walk passed through territory still littered with landmines from the Khmer Rouge. The initial walk consisted of approximately 350 monks, nuns, and lay Buddhists who escorted around 100 Cambodians from refugee camps to their villages in Cambodia. This was carried out without official permission from Thai or Cambodian officials to cross the border. By the time the march reached Phnom Penh it had grown in size significantly, and drew coverage from the international media. In recognition of his contributions, King Sihanouk bestowed on Maha Goshananda the title samdech song santipeap ('Leader of Religion and Peace') later that year. In 1992 he published a book titled Step by Step.

The Dhammayietra became an annual walk which Maha Ghosananda led a number of times, despite the danger during the Khmer Rouge years. In 1995, the Dhammayietra consisted of almost 500 Cambodian Buddhist monks, nuns and precept-taking lay people. They were joined by The Interfaith Pilgrimage for Peace and Life. Together the two groups crossed Cambodia from the Thai border all the way to Vietnam, spending several days walking through Khmer Rouge-controlled territory along the way. For his teachings on non-violence and establishing Buddhist temples throughout the world that root his exiled people in their religion of peace, he was presented with the Peace Abbey Courage of Conscience Award.

== Death and Legacy ==
He died in Northampton, Massachusetts on March 12, 2007. Peace walks have continued in Cambodia after his death.

He had been called "the Gandhi of Cambodia." and was a leading figure in engaged Buddhism. Ghosananda was nominated for the Nobel Peace Prize by the chair of the U.S. Senate Foreign Relations Committee, Claiborne Pell. He was again nominated in 1995, 1996, and 1997 for his work in bringing peace to Cambodia. He also acted as an adviser to the Buddhist Peace Fellowship and resided part-time in the Palelai Buddhist Temple and Monastery in Philadelphia, Pennsylvania, United States.

=== Awards Won ===
- 1992 – The Rafto Prize
- 1998 – Niwano Peace Prize
- 1998 – Courage of Conscience Award

== Books ==
- Maha Ghosananda Step By Step

== See also ==
- Dhammayietra
- Buddhism in Cambodia
- Supreme Patriarch of Cambodia

== Footnotes ==
Preceded by Huot Tat	Supreme Patriarch of Cambodia	Succeeded by Venerable Tep Vong years–
