= Supreme Patriarch of Cambodia =

Buddhist leader in Cambodia

Supreme Patriarch of the Kingdom of Cambodia
- សម្ដេចព្រះសង្ឃរាជនៃព្រះរាជាណាចក្រកម្ពុជា
- Incumbent; Vacant since 26 February 2024
- Style: His Holiness
- Appointer: King of Cambodia
- Term length: Lifetime

The Supreme Patriarch of Cambodia (Khmer: សម្ដេចព្រះសង្ឃរាជ; Pali: Sangharāja, is the de facto leader of Buddhism in Cambodia.

== Titles ==
The titles for the Cambodian Supreme Patriarchs are derived from Pali. The full official title of the Supreme Patriarch of the Maha Nikaya is Samdech Preah Sumedhādhipati (Khmer: សម្តេច ព្រះ សុមេធាធិបតី); sumedhādhipati means 'wise lord'. In letters with King-Father Norodom Sihanouk, the following title is used for the Great Supreme Patriarch Tep Vong: Samdech Preah Agga Mahā Sangharājādhipati (Khmer: សម្តេច ព្រះ អគ្គមហាសង្ឃរាជាធិបតី); which is translated as 'foremost great supreme patriarch leader'.

The full official title of the Supreme Patriarch of the Dhammayuttika Nikaya is Samdech Preah Aphiserei Sukonthea Mohasangreacheathipadei (Abhisirī Sugandhā Mahāsangharājādhipati) (Khmer: សម្តេច ព្រះ អភិសិរី សុគន្ធា មហាសង្ឃរាជាធិបតី). This title means 'Of Higher Merit and Pure Virtue, Great Supreme Patriarch Leader'. In letters with King-Father Sihanouk, an abbreviated title is used in the valediction: Samdech Preah Sangreach (Khmer: សម្តេច ព្រះ សង្ឃរាជ).'

== History ==
Between 1855 and 1981, there were two Supreme Patriarchs in the Kingdom of Cambodia: one for the Cambodian branch of the Thai Dhammayuttika Nikaya order, and one for the Maha Nikaya. In 1981, under the supervision of the Vietnamese-backed People's Republic of Kampuchea, Venerable Tep Vong was elected Supreme Patriarch of a new, unified sangha modelled on the Vietnamese Theravada Buddhist Sangha Congregation.

After the signing of the Paris Peace Accords in 1991, King Norodom Sihanouk appointed Venerable Bour Kry as Supreme Patriarch of Dhammayuttika Nikaya. Today, the two orders are each headed by their own patriarch, unlike in Thailand where only one Supreme Patriarch heads both orders. The Constitution of Cambodia provides a seat on the Royal Council of the Throne to both Supreme Patriarchs, thus giving each a say in the selection of the Cambodian sovereign.

In 2006, Tep Vong was elevated to the status of Great Supreme Patriarch, while Venerable Non Nget was subsequently elevated to Supreme Patriarch of the Maha Nikaya. Tep Vong is the first monk in 150 years to bear the title of Great Supreme Patriarch.

== Lists of Cambodian patriarchs ==
=== Supreme Patriarch of Maha Nikaya ===
| # | Portrait | Secular name | Dharma name | Titles | Birth & Death (Common Era) | Tenure (Common Era) | Notes |
|---|---|---|---|---|---|---|---|
| 1 | | Nil Teang និល ទៀង | Suvaṇṇakesaro សុវណ្ណកេសរោ | Samdech Preah Maha Sangharāja សម្តេចព្រះមហាសង្ឃរាជ | 1823-1913 | 1859-1913 | |
| 2 | | Keh Ouk កែ អ៊ុក | Indatthero ឥន្ទត្ថេរោ | Samdech Preah Dhammalikhita សម្ដេចព្រះធម្មលិខិត | 1851-1936 | 1914–1930 | |
| 3 | | Prak Hin ប្រាក់ ហ៊ិន | Sudhammatthero សុធម្មត្ថេរោ | Samdech Preah Maha Sumedhādhipatī សម្តេចព្រះមហាសុមេធាធិបតី | 1863-1947 | 1930-1947 | |
| 4 | | Chuon Nath ជួន ណាត | Jotañāṇo ជោតញ្ញាណោ | Samdech Preah Maha Sumedhādhipatī សម្តេចព្រះមហាសុមេធាធិបតី | 1883-1969 | 1948–1969 | |
| 5 | | Huot Tat ហួត តាត | Vajirapañño វជិរបញ្ញោ | Samdech Preah Maha Sumedhādhipatī សម្តេចព្រះមហាសុមេធាធិបតី | 1892-1975 | 1969–1975 | Died from Khmer Rouge execution at the Prang pagoda in Oudong district. |
| | | communist regimes | | | | 1975-1991 | |
| 6 | | Tep Vong ទេព វង្ស | Upekkhasambojjhamgiko ឧបេក្ខាសម្ពោជ្ឈង្គិកោ | Samdech Preah Maha Sumedhādhipatī សម្តេចព្រះមហាសុមេធាធិបតី | 1932–2024 | 1991–2006 | Elevated to the status of Great Supreme Patriarch of Cambodia. |
| 7 | | Non Nget នន្ទ ង៉ែត | Passaddhisambojjhaṃgo បស្សទ្ធិសម្ពោជ្ឈង្គោ | Samdech Preah Maha Sumedhādhipatī សម្តេចព្រះមហាសុមេធាធិបតី | 1924–present | 2006–present | |

=== Supreme Patriarch of Dhammayuttika Nikaya ===
| # | Portrait | Secular name | Dharma name | Titles | Birth & Death (Common Era) | Tenure (Buddhist Era) | Tenure (Common Era) | Notes |
|---|---|---|---|---|---|---|---|---|
| 1 | | Saukonn Pan ប៉ាន | Paññāsīlo បញ្ញាសីលោ | Samdech Preah Sugandhādhipatī សម្តេចព្រះសុគន្ធាធិបតី | 1826-1893 | | 1855–1893 | |
| 2 | | Eam អៀម | Bhaddagū ភទ្ទគូ | Samdech Preah Mangaladebācārya សម្តេចព្រះមង្គលទេពាចារ្យ | 1849-1922 | | 1893-1922 | |
| 3 | | Souk ស៊ុក | Paññādīpo បញ្ញាទីបោ | Samdech Preah Mangaladebācārya សម្តេចព្រះមង្គលទេពាចារ្យ | 1861-1943 | | 1923-1943 | |
| 4 | | Oung Srei អ៊ុង ស្រី | Buddhanāgo ពុទ្ធនាគោ | Samdech Preah Sudhammādhipatī សម្តេចព្រះសុធម្មាធិបតី | 1870-1956 | | 1943-1956 | |
| 5 | | Phul Tes ភុល ទេស | Indañāṇo ឥន្ទញាណោ | Samdech Preah Sudhammādhipatī សម្តេចព្រះសុធម្មាធិបតី | 1891-1966 | | 1956-1966 | |
| 6 | | Tep Leung ទេព លឿង | Gandharo គន្ធរោ | Samdech Preah Sudhammādhipatī សម្តេចព្រះសុធម្មាធិបតី | 1883-1975 | | 1966-1975 | Died just two days before the fall of Phnom Penh by Khmer Rouge. |
| 7 | | He Chea ហ៊ី ជា | | Samdech Preah Sangharāja សម្តេចព្រះសង្ឃរាជ | ?-1975 | | 1975 (less than one week) | Acting Supreme Patriarch of Dhammayutika Nikaya |
| 8 | | Bour Kry បួរ គ្រី | Candagiriko ចន្ទតិរិកោ | Samdech Preah Abhisirī Sugandhā Mahāsangharājādhipati សម្តេចព្រះអភិសិរីសុគន្ធា មហាសង្ឃរាជាធិបតី | 1945–present | | 1991–present | Hold the title of "Samdech Preah Sugandhadhipati" from 1991. Elevated to current title in 2007. |

=== Head of the Unified Sangha of Cambodia ===
| # | Portrait | Secular name | Dharma name | Order | Birth & Death (Common Era) | Tenure (Buddhist Era) | Tenure (Common Era) |
|---|---|---|---|---|---|---|---|
| 1 | | Tep Vong ទេព វង្ស | Upekkhasambojjhamgiko ឧបេក្ខាសម្ពោជ្ឈង្គិកោ | Maha Nikaya | 1932–2024 | | 1981–1991 |

=== Supreme Patriarch of Cambodia in exile ===
| # | Portrait | Secular name | Dharma name | Order | Birth & Death (Common Era) | Tenure (Buddhist Era) | Tenure (Common Era) |
|---|---|---|---|---|---|---|---|
| 1 | | Va Yav | Ghosananda ឃោសានន្ទ | Maha Nikaya | 1913-2007 | | 1988–2007 |

Note: In 1988, Maha Ghosananda was elected Supreme Patriarch by a group of exiled monks in Paris. During this same period, Tep Vong held the same office in the unified Cambodian sangha. After 1991, Tep Vong was recognized as head of the Maha Nikaya in Cambodia.

=== Great Supreme Patriarch of Cambodia ===
| # | Portrait | Secular name | Dharma name | Titles | Order | Birth & Death (Common Era) | Tenure (Buddhist Era) | Tenure (Common Era) |
|---|---|---|---|---|---|---|---|---|
| 1 | | Tep Vong ទេព វង្ស | Upekkhasambojjhamgiko ឧបេក្ខាសម្ពោជ្ឈង្គិកោ | Samdech Preah Agga Mahā Sangharājādhipati សម្តេចព្រះអគ្គមហាសង្ឃរាជាធិបតី | Maha Nikaya | 1932–2024 | | 2006–2024 |

== See also ==
- Agga Maha Pandita
- Buddhism in Cambodia
- Mahanayaka
- Sangharaja
- Sangha Supreme Council
- State Saṅgha Mahā Nāyaka Committee
- Supreme Patriarch of Thailand
- Thathanabaing of Burma
