= Tep Vong =

Cambodian Buddhist monk (1932–2024)

- ទេព វង្ស
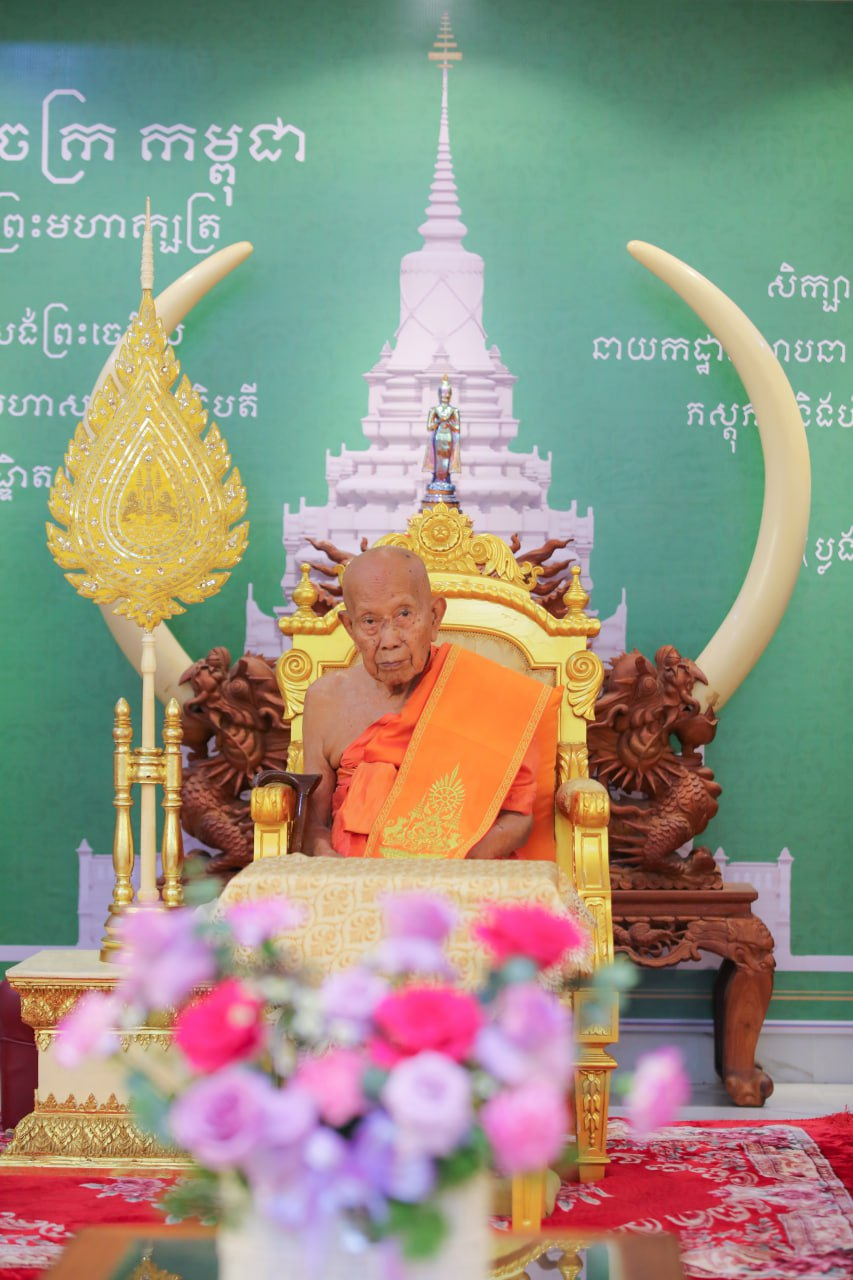
- Tep Vong in 2023
- Title: Great Supreme Patriarch of the Kingdom of Cambodia

Personal life
- Born: 12 January 1932 Siem Reap, Cambodia, French Indochina
- Died: 26 February 2024 (aged 92) Phnom Penh, Cambodia

Religious life
- Religion: Theravada Buddhism
- Lineage: Maha Nikaya

Samdech Preah Agga Maha Sangharajadhipati Tep Vong (Khmer: សម្ដេចព្រះអគ្គមហាសង្ឃរាជាធិបតី ទេព វង្ស; 12 January 1932 – 26 February 2024) was a Cambodian Buddhist monk who served as the Great Supreme Patriarch of Cambodia until his death in 2024. He was well known for his role in re-establishing the Cambodian monkhood after the Khmer Rouge era and for his links to leading political leaders after the 1980s including prime minister Hun Sen.

== Biography ==
=== Childhood of the pagoda child ===
Tep Vong was born at Trapeang Chork village in the Chreav commune of the Siem Reap municipality, and at the age of 10 went to study at Wat Reach Bo in the provincial capital of Siem Reap. At the age of 16, he was ordained as a novice at the same temple but, because of family duties, only assumed robes for nine months. His preceptor was the abbot of the temple – the Venerable Hing Mao. At the age of 21, he was ordained as a bhikkhu at the temple by the same preceptor. He was made kru sotr – the second-ranking monk of the temple in 1956.

=== Surviving the Khmers Rouges ===
Like almost all Cambodian monks, Tep Vong was forced to leave the monkhood during the 1975-9 Pol Pot regime. During those years, he was able to flee to Vietnam according to some sources, but this claim is subject to debate. Later, during the Vietnamese-sponsored People's Revolutionary Tribunal from 15 to 20 July 1979, Tep Vong accused Pol Pot himself of executing 57 monks, including three of his own nephews. Tep Vong was subsequently more merciful towards the Khmer Rouge leadership, even comparing Ieng Sary to Aṅgulimāla, the ruthless brigand who completely transforms after a conversion to Buddhism.

=== Re-ordination and restoration of the sangha after 1979 ===
Tep Vong was the youngest of seven senior monks re-ordained at Wat Ounalom in a state-sponsored ceremony on 19 September 1979 in order to create a core of ordained monks who could go on to ordain others and formally re-establish the Cambodian sangha, which had been nearly destroyed by the Khmer Rouge. Some questioned his seniority and even the validity of this ceremony. The new monastic lineage did not re-establish the distinction between Mahanikay and Dhammayut orders which had existed prior to their annihilation by Pol Pot.

Like most of the other monks ordained in the 19 September ceremony, Tep Vong had already resumed the life of a monk, probably in June, 1979. He represented the new People's Republic of Kampuchea (PRK) government as a monk on trips to Mongolia and the Soviet Union that year. He wore robes in August, 1979, when he gave evidence at the trial in absentia of Pol Pot and other Khmer Rouge leaders, testifying that agents of the Khmer Rouge had executed 57 monks in a single commune, including three of Tep Vong's own nephews. He also testified to having been put to hard labor during the nearly four years of the Khmer Rouge.

Following the 1979 ordination, he was made viney thor, meaning that he was in charge of discipline for the monkhood. At first, the oldest of the seven re-ordained monks, Kaet Vay, assumed the role of preceptor in the frequent ceremonies to ordain monks in the official lineage. For reasons of age, Kaet Vay discontinued this by 1981 when Tep Vong assumed this role. At this time, in effect, Tep Vong became the leader of the Unified Cambodian Buddhist Sangha. Instead of a Ministry of Religion, as existed before 1975, religious institutions in the People's Republic of Kampuchea were under the authority of the Solidarity Front for the Construction and Defence of the Motherland of Kampuchea, usually just called "The Front". Tep Vong was one of the original members of the Front's central committee and became its fourth vice-president in September 1979. In May 1981, he was also elected a member of the National Assembly as a representative of the province of Siem Reap and became the Vice-president of the National Assembly in July 1981.

The socialist People's Republic of Kampuchea did not use the term sangharaja, although the term is sometimes used to describe his position of leadership in the 1980s, which is more rightly described as "president" of the Cambodian Buddhist monks after July 1988 in a Communist context. He remained the sole leader of Cambodian Buddhism until 1991.

=== Leading the Mahanikay since 1991 ===
Following the 1991 Paris Peace Accords on 23 October, which made former king Norodom Sihanouk head of state, the monkhood was once again divided into Mahanikay and Dhammayut orders. Royal titles were also re-introduced in the monkhood. On 8 November 1991, in an official proclamation signed by Sihanouk, Tep Vong was given the title Samdech Preah Mahasomedhadhipati, and a week later, on 15 November was named sangaraja of the Mahanikay Order. Venerable Bour Kry was appointed sangharaja of the Dhammayut Order by Sihanouk on 7 December. Tep Vong became an ex officio member of the Cambodian Throne Council on 23 September 1993.

Tep Vong gave unconditional support for Hun Sen's leadership through all those years and beyond the 1997 coup. When, in the turmoil of the 1998 elections, twelve monks close to the opposition locked themselves up in one of the buildings of the temple Wat Ounalom, Tep Vong did not hesitate to request Hun Sen's help to deal with this situation. This led to virulant criticism and accusations against him from the opposition. In 2006, Tep Vong was "considered to be poorly trained in Buddhism and simply the mouthpiece of a Vietnamese-friendly government".

In 2002, Tep Vong appointed Tim Sakhorn as an abbot while knowing that the latter was not legitimate, being from Kampuchea Krom and not strictly a Khmer citizen. On 16 June 2007, Tep Vong was forced to defrock Tim Sakhorn after the latter used his platform to promote nationalist ideology and was accused of immoral conduct, having women in his room.

In 2003, Tep Vong issued a voting ban for the roughly 60,000 monks active in Cambodia. Under pressure, he rescinded that order in March 2006 so that monks could vote "for the development of the nation".

In 2006, Tep Vong was elevated to the title of Samdech Preah Agga Mahā Sangharājādhipati (Khmer: សម្តេច ព្រះ អគ្គមហាសង្ឃរាជាធិបតី), or Great Supreme Patriarch, placing him at the head of the two orders. He is the first monk in over 150 years to receive this title.

== Death ==
Tep Vong died on 26 February 2024, at the age of 93. The Cambodian Ministry of Cult and Religion attributed his death to an extended illness. His remains were placed at Wat Ounalom for public viewing ahead of his funeral.

== Contribution ==
=== Buddhism for education: reopening the pagoda schools across Cambodia ===
Tep Vong contributed significantly to the role of Buddhist pagodas in the re-education of Cambodian youth after the downfall of Year Zero. Along with his colleague, Venerable Oum Som, who was "the monk with the most clerical education in post-Pol Pot Cambodia", he contributed opening schools for both boys and girls in pagodas, from kindergarten to high school across the country to bring back literacy to Cambodia.

=== Buddhism for politics: building peace together after years of persecution ===
After he was forced to flee his country for his attachment to his religion, Tep Vong returned to his country under occupation by an anti-religious Vietnamese Communist party. Thus, he was able to negotiate the restoration of the Buddhist sangha through his close ties with government officials, ties which, through the years, have been criticised. Tep Vong made visits to Mongolia and the Soviet Union to discover more about "the appropriate model of church-state relations in a socialist country". Tep Vong was also given an audience with Pope John Paul II along with Preah Maha Gosananda, becoming one of the international faces of Cambodian Buddhism. He was one of the Co-Presidents of the international organization Religions for Peace.

However, Venerable Tep Vong was criticised by younger members of the sangha for his ties to the government of Vietnam and for being close to the leadership of the Cambodian People's Party which dominated the government. He came into conflict with younger members of the sangha who voiced opposition to government policies and corruption, on one occasion calling publicly for the arrest of the organizers of an anti-government protest. In one instance, while President of the Unified Sangha, Tep Vong put forth the argument that certain forms of political violence could be condoned by Buddhism.

=== Buddhism for health: between social healthcare for the poor and harsh statements on HIV/AIDS ===
In his efforts to reform the Buddhist pagodas in Cambodia after the Khmers Rouges, Venerable Tep Vong turned many pagodas into retirement homes for destitute widows known as the donchee who were given palliative care by the hundred. However, Tep Vong also took some controversial stands on health-related issues. He spoke out on several occasions regarding issues surrounding the HIV/AIDS situation in Cambodia, in particular, following a 2000 conference organized for monks by the National AIDS Authority. Tep Vong stated that he believed that Cambodia's HIV/AIDS problem had been overstated by Cambodia's enemies in order to discredit the ruling government. He also stated that HIV/AIDS is a form of karmic punishment that is best dealt with by cracking down on prostitution, and that monks should not take any role in treating HIV/AIDS patients, nor in disseminating HIV education. Certain elements of the Mohanikaya attempted to position monks as conduits for educational materials regarding HIV/AIDS, a position opposed by Tep Vong.

== Honors ==
Tep Vong had the honorific title of Samdech and was a member of the Royal Council of the Throne of Cambodia.
