= Huot Tat =

5th Supreme Patriarch of the Maha Nikaya Order in Cambodia

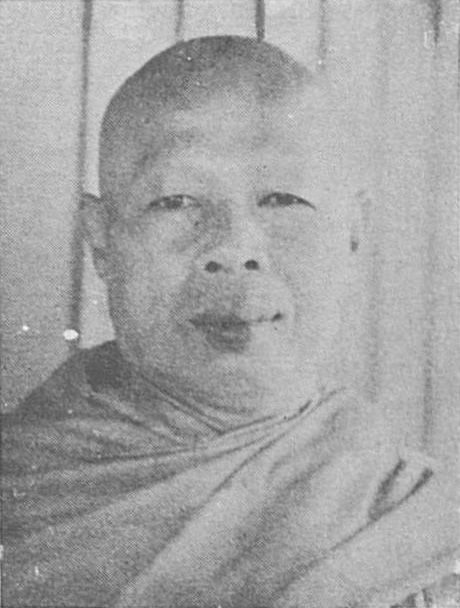
- Title: Supreme Patriarch of Cambodia

Personal life
- Born: 15 January 1892 Oudong, Cambodia, French Indochina
- Died: 1975 (aged 82–83) Kampuchea

Religious life
- Religion: Buddhism
- School: Theravada
- Lineage: Maha Nikaya

Senior posting
- Predecessor: Chuon Nath
- Successor: Tep Vong

Samdech Preah Mahā Somethea Dhipati Huot Tath (also spelled Huot Tath and Hout Tath) (Khmer: ហួត តាត, 15 January 1892–1975), Dharma name: Vajirapañño, was the fifth Supreme Patriarch of the Maha Nikaya order of Cambodia from 1969 until he was executed by Angkar (The Organization) after it came to power in 1975.

Huot Tat was born in Oudong District, Kampong Speu Province. He joined the monkhood when he was 13. In 1969, he succeeded Chuon Nath as the new Supreme Patriarch of the Maha Nikaya order upon the latter's death.

On 17 April 1975, immediately after the Khmer Rouge's march into Phnom Penh, when Angkar came to power at the end of the civil war, Huot Tat and all the Buddhist monks were ordered to leave the city. The next day, he was taken to Oudong, where he was insulted and beaten. He was executed at the Prang pagoda in Oudong district. His statue was later thrown into the Mekong River.

The Khmer Rouge led by Angkar, more than 25,000 monks were executed. 1,968 Buddhist buildings, including temples and monasteries, were destroyed, while the remaining 90–95% of the monastic population disappeared by Angkar under its rule.
