= Sangharaja =

Buddhist honorific

Sangharaja (Pāḷi: saṅgha religious community + rāja ruler, king, or prince) is the title given in many Theravada Buddhist countries to a senior monk who is the titular head either of a monastic fraternity (nikāya), or of the Sangha throughout the country. This term is often rendered in English as 'Patriarch' or 'Supreme Patriarch'.

== Overview ==
The position of sangharaja has been assigned according to various methods in different countries and time periods. In some cases, the sangharaja is determined by absolute monastic seniority; the sangharaja is the monk who has spent the most rains retreats (vassa) as a monk. In other cases, royal appointment may play a role--the sangharaja may be appointed by the king, particularly in Southeast Asian countries where the monarchy is closely associated with Buddhism (Thailand, for example). Alternatively, the sangharaja may be chosen semi-democratically by monks or the laity (similar to the election of an abbot in some Theravada communities).

The authority and responsibility assigned to the sangharaja can also vary significantly. Traditionally, Buddhist monasticism has not imposed any particular obligation of obedience on Buddhist monks. Any monk can offer criticism of any other monk with regards to violations of disciplinary rules, and a monk is not bound to follow the orders or recommendations of another monk - even a senior monk. While in practice, the respect accorded to a senior monk and the standards of the local community often provide a significant impetus for requests from senior monks to be obeyed, there is no traditional or scriptural demand for such attitudes. Most monasteries – even in areas where a sangharaja has been appointed – remain primarily self-governing or, at the most, dependent on a single larger temple in the same region.

As such, in some cases the sangharaja is primarily a figurehead, a focal point and spokesman for Buddhist piety, but not endowed with any particular authority. Even without any clearly designated authority or responsibilities, a sangharaja can often effect significant changes in a Theravada country by employing the respect accorded to him and his office to mobilize monks and laymen for social or religious change. Preah Maha Ghosananda of Cambodia was an example of this type of sangharaja – one whose influence over the local religious community far exceeded any ecclesiastic authority that he may have wielded.

In other cases, the sangharaja may be part of a national or regional hierarchy that is responsible for settling issues of wider importance to the national sangha. The Supreme Patriarch of Thailand operates in this mold, in association with the civil government. The central religious hierarchy is responsible for issues of national and regional importance- such as the curriculum of monastic schools, the creation of authoritative forms for scriptures and rituals, and reform issues of nationwide importance – leaving most local decisions to the discretion of individual temples and abbots (such as the ordination and disciplining of individual monks). The position of Sangharaja is currently defunct in Sri Lanka, as no Buddhist monk was appointed to this position in the last two centuries. Mahanayaka theros who act as the chief prelates of three main sects Siyam Nikaya, Amarapura Nikaya and Ramanna Nikaya are considered to be the highest ranked Buddhist monks in the country.

== Sangharaja in Myanmar ==
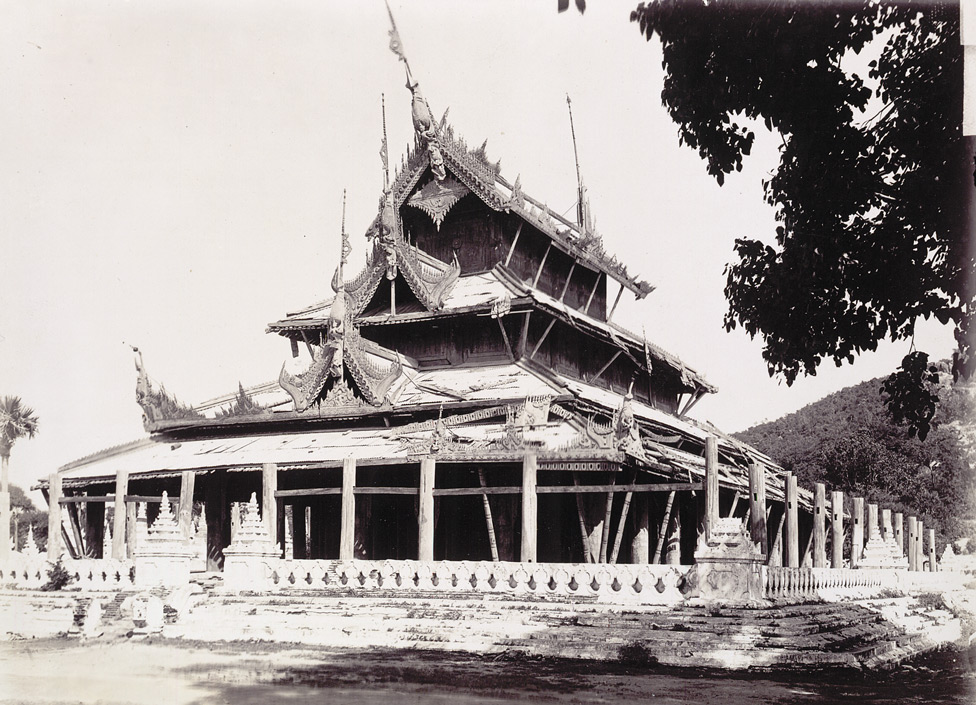
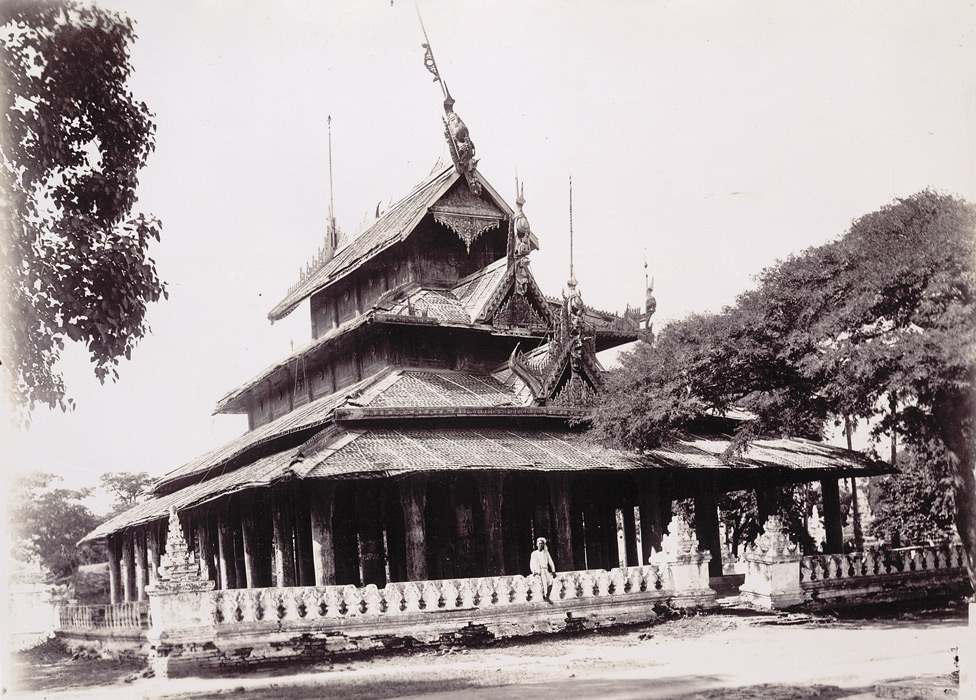
The election of the Thathanapaing in 1902 was held at the Thudhamma and Pahtan Zayats near Mandalay Hill.

In Myanmar, the office of Sangharaja of each Gaing is known as the Thathanabaing (သာသနာပိုင်, literally 'Keeper of the Sāsana').

The Thathanabaing of Burma, formally Mahāsaṃgharājā (မဟာသံဃရာဇာ), typically rendered into English as 'Primate', 'Archbishop' or 'Supreme Patriarch,' served as the head of the Buddhist order of monks (bhikkhu) in Burma until 1938, but each Gaing continue to appoint individual Gaing Thathanabaings to this day. Thudhamma Gaing is the exception in which the office of Thathanabaing is formally vacant but the serving Chairman of the State Samgha Maha Nayaka Committee also has to serve as the leader of Thudhamma Gaing.

Currently, the 5th Chairman of the State Samgha Maha Nayaka Committee is Thanlyin Mingyaung Sayadaw. Sitagu Sayadaw is the 16th Shwegyin Thathanabaing.

== Sangharaja in Sri Lanka ==
In Sri Lanka, from the Kingdom of Polonnaruwa (13th century) the title of Sangharaja has been created by the king Parakramabahu the great. In the beginning, this title of Sangharaja was also known as Mahasami, the head of the Sangha community of the whole country. The first Sri Lankan Buddhist monk to hold this title was Dimbulagala Maha Kassapa Maha Thero. However some sources suggests that Thotagamuwe Sri Rahula Thera, who was conferred with Sangharaja position by King Parakramabahu VI as the first Sangharaja of Sri Lanka. Welivita Sri Saranankara Thero who was appointed to this position by king Kirthi Sri Rajasinghe in 1753, was the last Sangharaja of Sri Lanka.

== Sangharaja in Cambodia ==
In Cambodia and the former Khmer kingdoms, the sangharaja (Khmer: សង្ឃរាជ sangkhareach) was a senior monk appointed by the king who headed one of the countries monastic fraternities. From the period between 1855 and the beginning of the Khmer Rouge era, one sangharaja existed for the Cambodian branch of the Dhammayuttika Nikaya, and another for the Maha Nikaya. Because the Dhammayuttika order enjoyed closer ties to the throne, it officially had primacy in Cambodia despite constituting a small majority of Khmer monks.

During the Khmer Rouge period, the role of sangharaja essentially vanished, as Buddhism was officially suppressed first by the Khmer Rouge. The Vietnam-backed People's Republic of Kampuchea began to reverse its stance in order to gain wider popular support for its rule, and the venerable Tep Vong was appointed the new sangharaja by the government in 1981, with both nikayas combined into a single unified order.

Upon his return from exile in 1991, King Sihanouk appointed Bour Kry sangharaja of the Dhammayuttika order, returning Cambodia to the two-patriarch system. As the monarchy no longer has government status in Cambodia, the two fraternities are now officially equals. The full official title of the Supreme Patriarch of the Maha Nikaya is Samdech Preah Sumedhādhipati, while the full official title of the Supreme Patriarch of the Dhammayuttika Nikaya is Samdech Preah Sugandhādhipati.

== Sangharaja (Sangkharat) in Thailand ==
The Sangharaja (Thai: พระสังฆราช; RTGS: Phra Sangkharat) of Thailand is traditionally appointed by the king, Rama I having appointed the first of modern times in 1782. Since passage of the Sangha Act of 1902 in the reign of Rama V, the office has tended to alternate between ordained monks of the majority order of Maha Nikaya, and of the minority order of Dhammayuttika Nikaya. The latter began as a reform movement within the larger order, established by Prince Mongkut, while he was an abbot with the ordination name of Vajirañāṇo, before renouncing the monastic life to ascend the throne as Rama IV.

== Sangharaja in Laos ==
The Sangharaja of Laos was traditionally appointed by the King of Laos (the monarchy of Luang Phrabang)

== Modern sangharajas ==
- Sayadaw Phyagyi Ashin Cantimabhivamsa, current sangharaja of Myanmar
- Somdet Phra Ariyavongsagatanana, current sangharaja of Thailand
- Preah Maha Ghosananda, (Maha Nikaya) the late sangharaja of Cambodia*
- Samdech Preah Sugandhādhipati Bour Kry, current sangharaja of the Dhammayuttika Nikaya of Cambodia
- Samdech Preah Sumedhādhipati Non Nget, current sangharaja of the Maha Nikaya of Cambodia
- Samdech Preah Agga Mahā Sangharājādhipati Tep Vong, current agga sangharaja of Cambodia

In 1988, Maha Ghosananda was elected Supreme Patriarch by a group of exiled monks in Paris, however this status was not officially recognized in Cambodia. During this same period, Tep Vong held the same office in the unified Cambodian sangha, and after 1991 as the Supreme Patriarch of the Maha Nikaya.

== See also ==
- Agga Maha Pandita
- List of Buddhist sanghas and governing bodies
- Mahanayaka
- Supreme Patriarch of Thailand
- Supreme Patriarch of Cambodia
- Thathanabaing of Burma
- Sangha Supreme Council, Thailand
- State Saṅgha Mahā Nāyaka Committee, Myanmar
