= Preah Sihanouk Raja Buddhist University =

Buddhist university in Cambodia

- ពុទ្ធិកសាកលវិទ្យាល័យព្រះសីហនុរាជ (Khmer)
- Established: 1954
- Founders: Huot Tath
- Affiliations: Buddhism in Cambodia
- Academic staff: 48
- Total staff: 82
- Students: 500
- Location: Preah Sisowath Quay, Phnom Penh, Kingdom of Cambodia; 11.563508153817473°N 104.934169615344°E

Preah Sihanouk Raja Buddhist University (Note: Khmer: ពុទ្ធិកសាកលវិទ្យាល័យព្រះសីហនុរាជ, UNGEGN: Pŭtthĭkâsakâlôvĭtyéaloăy Preăh Seihânŭréach, ALA-LC: Buddhikasākalavidyālăy Braḥ Sīhanurāj) is a non-profit public higher-education institution located in the metropolis of Phnom Penh in the Kingdom of Cambodia.

== History ==
=== Creation of the first Buddhist University in Cambodia by King Sihanouk ===
Preah Sihanouk Raja Buddhist University was founded on 1 July 1954 as the continuation of the Pali school founded in Phnom Penh in 1914. The university was founded under the royal patronage of King Norodom Sihanouk, then the King of Cambodia. It was the first educational institution providing higher Buddhist education to monk students and the third oldest Buddhist University in the world. Its first Rector was Venerable Huot Tath. The latter had suggested to the King that Buddhist education being reorganized after the country regained national independence on 9 November 1953.

Admission was limited to only 40 students for each academic year, essentially male Buddhist monks.

Teachers and students of the university like Pen Saeun joined the Tripitaka Translation Commission translating Pali Tripitaka into Khmer language undertaken by the Buddhist Institute, Phnom Penh, was completed in total in 1969.

=== Closure and destruction during Khmer Civil War and Khmers Rouges ===
While the number of students constantly increased until reaching 200 students in first year in 1972 after the entrance examination was abolished, lack of funding during the Khmer Civil War led to the university being closed down in 1972. During the terror regime of the Khmers Rouges between 1975 and 1979, the university suffered severe damage and most of its faculty was killed.

=== Re-establishing the University with the return of democracy ===
The present structure of the university started in 1996, when it was re-established after the return to democracy in Cambodia. The university began by offering the Buddhist upper-secondary education, and proceeded to offer bachelor's degree in 1999.

The university created the Faculty of Education Science in 2002.

=== Recognition as an official university ===
On January 23, 2006, Preah Sihanouk Raja Buddhist University was upgraded by a sub-degree of the Royal Government of Cambodia to be a full-fledged university, with the addition of two more Faculties and a Center.

In 2007, a teacher in political philosophy at the university called Tieng Narith was sentenced to prison for publishing and teaching from his own anti-government textbook.

In 2008, the university only had 10 academic staff while three times as many teachers were recruited from other institutions to serve as replacement, affecting the quality and the stability of the teaching.

== Structure ==
Currently the Buddhist University consists of four Faculties and a Center as follows:

- Faculty of Philosophy and Religions
- Faculty of Education and Information Technology
- Faculty of Khmer Literature
- Faculty of Pali-Sanskrit and Foreign Languages
- Center of Teacher Training

Each faculty is headed by a Dean and Deputy Deans. It consists of a few Departments.

At present, there are 35 non academic staff members and 48 academic staff members.

== Campus ==
This institution also has its main campus in Phnom Penh but it also owns branch campuses in the following locations: Kampong Cham, Battambang.
