= Dhammayietra =

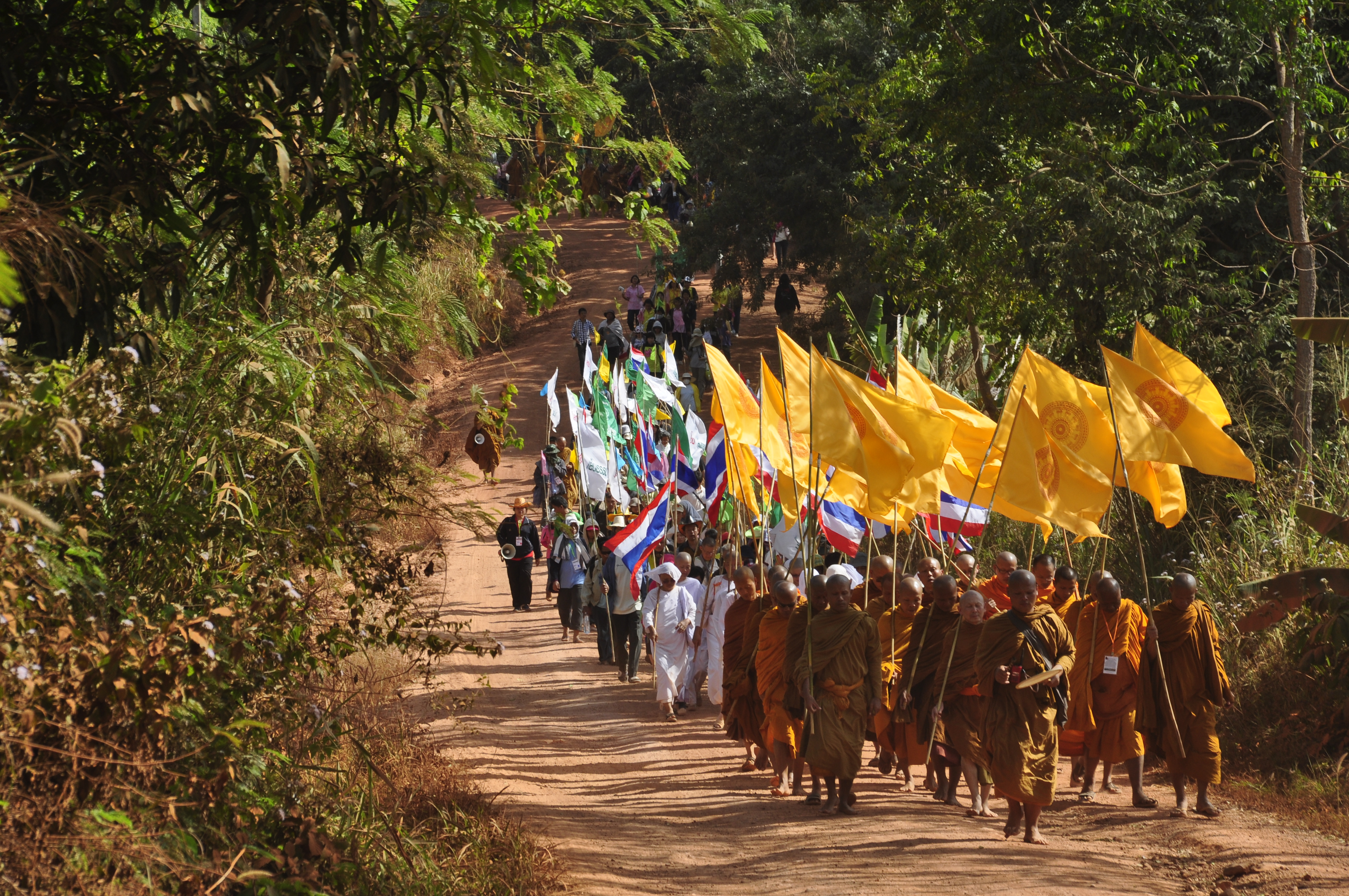
Dhammayietra, an annual peace march in Lampatao, Cambodia at Thailand border against communal violence.

The Dhammayietra (Khmer: ធម្មយាត្រា, "pilgrimage"; ) is an annual peace walk in Cambodia that originated during the historic repatriation of refugees along the Thai border camps during the United Nations monitored transition to democracy in 1992. The Khmer word "dhammayietra", derived from the Pāli dhamma (𑀥𑀫𑁆𑀫, "dharma") and yātrā (𑀬𑀸𑀢𑁆𑀭𑀸, "walk" or "procession"), means "pilgrimage" but is often translated as "pilgrimage of truth". The peace walk takes place in early May and usually involves an assemblage of Buddhist monks and laity who travel various routes in Cambodia.

The assemblage is often greeted by villagers along the route who expect a blessing (teuk mon Khmer: ទឹកមន្ត or blessing with lustral water). The founder of the Dhammayietra was Maha Ghosananda (Khmer: សម្តេចព្រះមហាឃោសានន្ទ), a Buddhist monk who ranked among the higher echelons of the Cambodian sangha; he led the first Dhammayietra as he returned from exile following the war.

In 1995, the Dhammayietra consisted of almost 500 Cambodian Buddhist monks, nuns and precept-taking lay people. They were joined by The Interfaith Pilgrimage for Peace and Life. Together the two groups crossed Cambodia from the Thai border all the way to Vietnam, spending several days walking through Khmer Rouge controlled territory along the way.

The 1997 Dhammayietra marched from Battambang to Pailin, which was at the time controlled by the Khmer Rouge, and on to Banteay Chhmar in Banteay Meanchey Province. The Khmer Rouge banned monks from their territory in Pailin and prohibited the open practice of religion until 1996 when the majority of Khmer Rouge distanced themselves from Pol Pot and declared Ieng Sary their new leader. After this mass defection, monks were tolerated in the area. The 1994 Dhammayietra, which also aimed to march through Pailin failed to reach its destination due to heavy fighting in the province. In Pailin, Ghosananda briefly met with Ieng Sary who respectfully received a blessing but did not attend the official ceremonies. The march, which took place just months before the 1997 Cambodian Coup, was unexpectedly joined in Pailin, for 15 kilometers, by Sam Rainsy and his numerous bodyguards. Rainsy used the opportunity to criticize the absence of the two Prime Ministers, Hun Sen and Prince Norodom Ranariddh, who unbeknownst at the time, were embroiled in tensions that would soon erupt into armed fighting between the two and their supporters for control of the government.
