= Bour Kry =

Cambodian Buddhist monk (born 1945)

- បួរ គ្រី
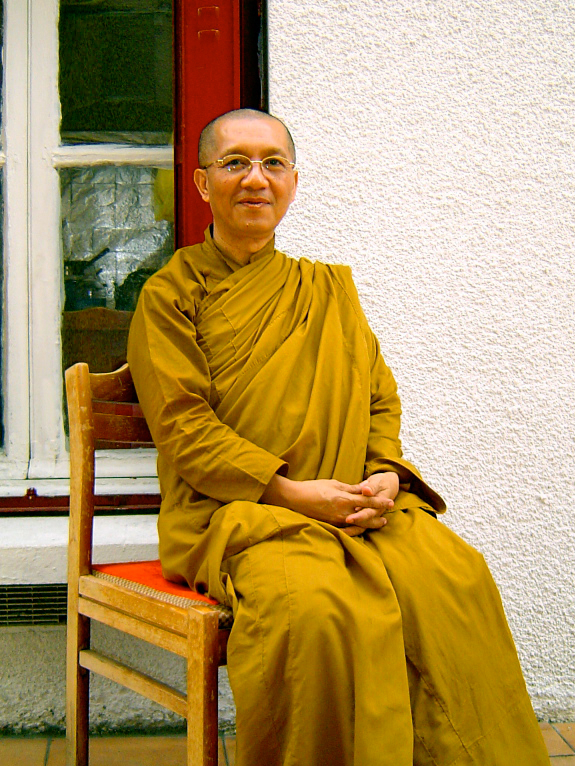
- Samdech Preah Sangkhareach Bour Kry at Wat Khemararam
- Title: Sangharaja

Personal life
- Born: 11 January 1945 (age 81) Phra Tabong, Thailand

Religious life
- Religion: Buddhism
- School: Theravada
- Lineage: Dhammayuttika Nikaya
- Dharma name: Chankirikao ចន្ទតិរិកោ

Senior posting
- Predecessor: Tep Leung

Samdech Preah Sangkhareach Bour Kry (Khmer: សម្ដេចព្រះសង្ឃរាជ បួរ គ្រី, romanized: Sǎmdăch Preăh Sǎngkheăriach Bua Kri; born 11 January 1945) is the seventh and current Supreme Patriarch of the Thammayut order of Cambodia.

== Early life ==
Bour Kry was born in Battambang and was ordained as a Buddhist monk in 1963. His early years in the monkhood were devoted to the study of the Pali Canon. In the following years, he was given the spiritual post of Secretary of the Mekon and appointed to the head of a monastery on the Thai-Cambodian border.

== Exile in France ==
The rise to power of the Khmer Rouge in 1975 began a grim and violent period for the country, and the existence of the Cambodian Sangha was put in critical danger. Bour Kry managed to flee, arriving in France in 1976. In 1977, he founded the Association Bouddhique Khmer (Khmer Buddhist Association) with a small group of expatriate monks and laypersons. The growth of this religious community in the following years led to the establishment of Vatt Khémararam at Créteil, a suburb of Paris, in 1980. Bour Kry's continued support for the Southeast Asian refugee community saw the foundation of Secours Bouddhique International (International Buddhist Assistance), a humanitarian organization independent of the monastery, in 1982.

== Royal nominations ==
Prince Norodom Sihanouk appointed Bour Kry to the rank of Spiritual Eminence (Khmer: សម្តេចព្រះអង្គគ្រូ) in 1987. Following the signing of the Paris Agreement in 1991, King Norodom Sihanouk further appointed Bour Kry to the head of the Cambodian Buddhist Dhammayuttika order with the title of Supreme Patriarch (Khmer: សម្តេចព្រះសុគន្ធាធិបតី).

== Social and religious activities ==
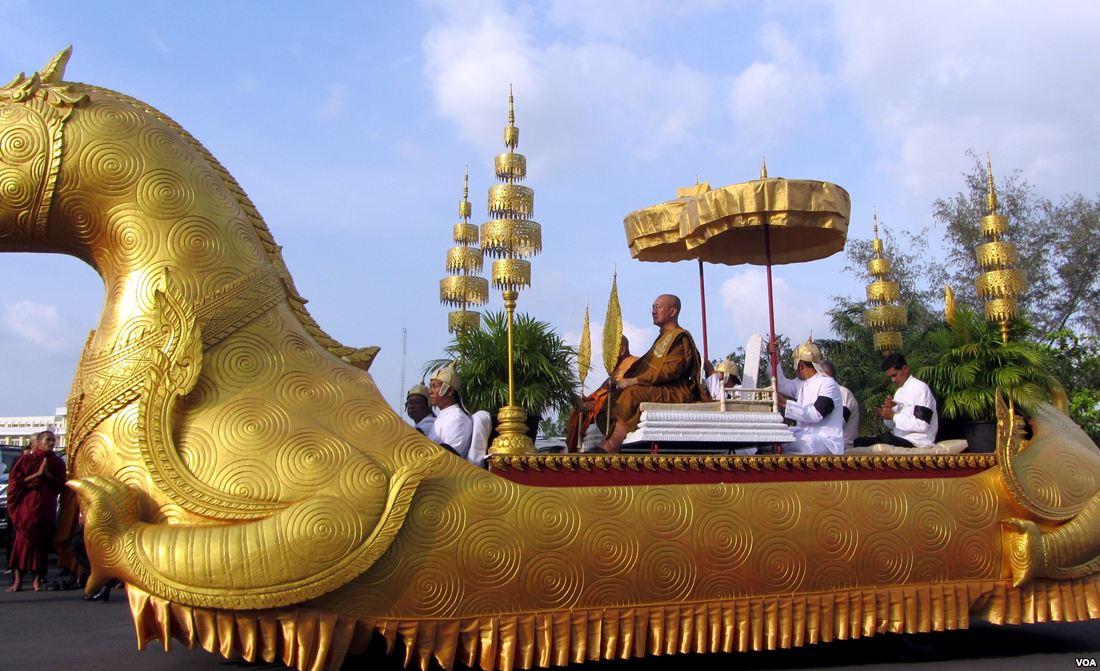
Bour Kry in a funerary procession of the late Norodom Sihanouk

After 1991 Bour Kry returned regularly to Cambodia to assist in the reconstruction and redevelopment of Buddhist schools and monasteries. The number of Dhammayuttika monasteries has since grown to over 150. The Preah Sihanouk Dhammadhiraj Buddhist Institute was founded in 1995 with the goal of education and professional training for Cambodia's poorest youth, the revitalization of Buddhist teachings, and the introduction of Cambodian youth to Khmer culture and traditions.

Bour Kry has been involved in addressing the spread of AIDS, participating in international discussions on the topic and encouraging the role of the monastery in disseminating health information. He has also been active in spreading information concerning drug and cigarette dependence in Cambodia.

== Titles ==
As the Supreme Patriarch of the Dhammayuttika Nikaya, Bour Kry's full official title is Samdech Preah Aphiserei Sukonthea Mohasangreacheathipadei (Abhisirī Sugandhā Mahāsangharājādhipati) (Khmer: សម្តេច ព្រះ អភិសិរី សុគន្ធា មហាសង្ឃរាជាធិបតី). This title means 'Of Higher Merit and Pure Virtue, Great Supreme Patriarch Leader'. In letters with King-Father Sihanouk, an abbreviated title is used in the valediction: Samdech Preah Sangreach (Khmer: សម្តេច ព្រះ សង្ឃរាជ).

== See also ==
- Royal Council of the Throne
- Buddhism in Cambodia
- Dhammayuttika Nikaya
- Modern Cambodia
- Norodom Sihanouk
- Supreme Patriarch of Cambodia
