= Maha Nikaya =

Buddhist monastic order

The Mahā Nikāya (lit. 'great order') is an order of Theravāda Buddhist monks. It is one of the two main monastic orders in Thailand, the other being the Dhammayuttika Nikāya.

== History ==
After the founding of the Dhammayuttika Nikāya by the then-monk Prince Mongkut in 1830, decades later all recognized monks not ordained in the Dhammayuttika order were considered to be part of the maha nikāya, the "great collection" of those outside the new Dhammayuttika fraternity. As such, most monks in Thailand belong to the Maha Nikāya more or less by default; the order itself did not originally establish any particular practices or views that characterized those adhering to its creed. There were in reality hundreds of different Nikayas throughout the Thai areas that were lumped together as the "Maha Nikāya".

In Thailand, a single supreme patriarch is recognized as having authority over both the Maha Nikāya and the Dhammayuttika Nikāya. In recent years some Maha Nikāya monks have campaigned for the creation of a separate Maha Nikāya patriarch, as almost all recent Thai supreme patriarchs have invariably been drawn from the royalty-supported Dhammayuttika Nikāya, despite Dhammayuttika Nikāya monks making up only six percent of the monks in Thailand.

== Sources ==
- Buswell, Robert E. Jr.; Lopez, Donald S. Jr (2014). The Princeton Dictionary of Buddhism. Princeton University Press. ISBN 978-0-691-15786-3.
- Gedney, William J. (1947). Indic Loanwords in Spoken Thai (PDF) (PhD thesis). Yale University.
- Jackson, Peter A. (2003). Buddhadāsa: Theravada Buddhism and Modernist Reform in Thailand. Silkworm Books. ISBN 974-7551-91-8.
- Jayasāro, Ajahn (2017). Stillness Flowing: The Life and Teachings of Ajahn Chah (PDF). Panyaprateep Foundation. ISBN 978-616-7930-09-1.
- Khantipālo, Bhikkhu (2008). Banner of the Arahants: The History of the Theravāda Order of Buddhist Monks and Nuns. Buddhist Publication Society. ISBN 978-955-24-0311-8.
- Robinson, Richard H.; Johnson, Willard L. (1997). The Buddhist Religion: A Historical Introduction (4th ed.). Wadsworth Publishing Company. ISBN 0-534-20718-9.
- Tiyavanich, Kamala (1997). Forest Recollections: Wandering Monks in Twentieth-Century Thailand. University of Hawaiʻi Press. ISBN 0-8248-1768-0.
