= List of Buddhist sanghas and governing bodies =

This is a growing List of Buddhist Sanghas and Governing Bodies. A sangharaja or patriarch is the senior monk of a Buddhist Sangha. A supreme sangharaja is the head of more than one Buddhist order.

== Sanghas of Bangladesh ==
Bangladesh Sangharaj Bhikkhu Mahasabha (The Supreme Sangha Council of Bangladesh)
Sangha	Sangharaja of Bhikkhu Mahasabha	Term of Office	Headquarters
Sangha Bhikkhu Mahasabha
Sangha Bhikkhu Mahasabha	Ven. Dr. Gyanashree Mahathero, 13th Sangharaja of Bangladesh	2020–present	Chattogram
Sangha Bhikkhu Mahasabha	Ven. Saramedha Mahathero, 1st Sangharaja of Bangladesh	1801-1882	Chattogram
Sangha Bhikkhu Mahasabha	Ven. Purnachar Chandramohan Mahathero, 2nd Sangharaja of Bangladesh	1837–1907	Chattogram
Sangha Bhikkhu Mahasabha	Ven. Gyanalankar Mahathero, 3rd Sangharaja of Bangladesh	1838–1927	Chattogram
Sangha Bhikkhu Mahasabha	Ven. Baragyan Mahathero, 4th Sangharaja of Bangladesh	1867–1936	Chattogram
Sangha Bhikkhu Mahasabha	Ven. Tejabanta Mahathero, 5th Sangharaja of Bangladesh	1868–1942	Chattogram
Sangha Bhikkhu Mahasabha	Ven. Dharmananda Mahathero, 6th Sangharaja of Bangladesh	1873–1957	Chattogram
Sangha Bhikkhu Mahasabha	Ven. Abhoytissa Mahathero, 7th Sangharaja of Bangladesh	1884–1974	Chattogram
Sangha Bhikkhu Mahasabha	Ven. Shilankar Mahathero, 8th Sangharaja of Bangladesh	1900–2000	Chattogram
Sangha Bhikkhu Mahasabha	Ven. Nagasen Mahathero, 9th Sangharaja of Bangladesh	1908–1992	Chattogram
Sangha Bhikkhu Mahasabha	Ven. Jyotipal Mahathero, 10th Sangharaja of Bangladesh	1914–2001	Chattogram
Sangha Bhikkhu Mahasabha	Ven. Shasanashree Mahathero, 11th Sangharaja of Bangladesh	1921–2003	Chattogram
Sangha Bhikkhu Mahasabha	Ven. Dr. Dharmasen Mahathero, 12th Sangharaja of Bangladesh	1928–2020	Chattogram

Sanghas of Canada - Vesak in Ottawa Connects the World

Vesak in Ottawa Connects the World www.VesakInOttawa.com - Facebook: ProjectVesakInOttaw

== Sanghas of Cambodia ==
The Supreme Sangha of Cambodia
Sangha	Supreme Sangharaja of Cambodia	Term of Office	Headquarters
Supreme Sangha of Cambodia	Supreme Sangharaja Tep Vong	2006–present	Phnom Penh
Cambodian Nikayas	Cambodian Patriarchs	Term of Office	Headquarters
Maha Nikaya	Patriarch Non Nget	2006–present	Phnom Penh
Dhammayuttika Nikaya	Patriarch Bour Kry	1991–present	Phnom Penh

== Sanghas of Myanmar ==
=== Historical ===
- Thathanabaing#List of Mahasamgharaja Thathanabaings
- Thathanabaing#List of chairmen of the State Samgha Maha Nayaka Committee
- Thathanabaing#List of Ganadhipati Thathanabaings

=== Incumbent ===
Chair of the State Saṃgha Mahā Nāyaka Committee
Committee		Title		Holder		Term of Office	Headquarters
9th	State Saṃgha Mahā Nāyaka Committee	5th	Chairman of State Saṃgha Mahā Nāyaka Committee	Thanlyin Mingyaung Sayadaw	Bhaddanta Candimābhivaṃsa	9 March 2024 - present	Yangon
9th	State Saṃgha Mahā Nāyaka Committee	See State Samgha Maha Nayaka Committee#State Saṃgha Mahā Nāyaka Committee, 9th (2025-present) for Vice-chairmen, Secretary, Associate Secretaries, and Members.					
Gaṇādhipati (Head of Sect)
Gaṇa (Sect)		Title		Holder		Term of Office	Headquarters
Sudhammā Sect		(-)	Mahā Saṃgharājā Thathanabaing Sayadaw	vacant (Chairman of SSMNC is regarded as the Gaṇādhipati of Sudhammā Sect)			
Sudhammā Sect		5th	Chairman of State Saṃgha Mahā Nāyaka Committee	Thanlyin Mingyaung Sayadaw	Bhaddanta Candimābhivaṃsa	9 March 2024 - present	Yangon
Shwegyin Nikāya Sect		16th	Shwegyin Thathanabaing, Shwegyin Nikāyādhipati Ukkaṭṭha Mahā Nāyaka Dhamma Senāpati	Sitagu Sayadaw	Bhaddanta Ñāṇissara	21 March 2023 - present	Mandalay
Shwegyin Nikāya Sect		Associate Shwegyin Thathanabaing, Shwegyin Nikāya Upa Ukkaṭṭha Mahā Nāyaka		Rector Sayadaw	Bhaddanta Nandamālābhivaṃsa	2018 - present	Mandalay
Dhammānudhamma Mahādvāra Nikāya Sect		16th	Mahādvāra Sect Thathanabaing Saṃgharāja Gaṇādhipati Dhamma Senāpati Mahā Nāyaka Guru		Bhaddanta Varasāmi		Letpadan
Dhammānudhamma Mahādvāra Nikāya Sect		Vice Thathanabaing Mahā Nāyaka Dhamma Senāpati			Bhaddanta Pañāvanta		Hinthada
Dhammavinayānuloma Mūladvāra Nikāya Sect			Mūladvāra Thathanabaing	Kamma Sayadaw	Bhaddanta Citrañana	2019 - present	Kamma
A-nauk-chaung Dvāra Sect							
Veḷuvanna Nikāya Sect		15th	Gaṇādhipati Thathanabaing	Paṇḍitāyonkyaungdaik Sayadaw	Baddanta Paññinda	5 May 2024 - present	Thaton
Catubhummika Mahāsatipaṭṭhāna Hnget-twin Sect		10th	Gaṇādhipati	Maymyo Sayadaw	Bhaddanta Vijaya		
Gaṇavimut Kudo Sect							
Dhammayutti Nikāya Mahā Yin Sect							

== Sangha of Laos ==
Lao United Buddhists Association
Sangha of Laos	Sangha President of Laos	Term of Office	Headquarters
Sangha of Laos	Sangha President Vichit Singalat		Vientiane

== Sanghas of Thailand ==
Supreme Sangha Council of Thailand
Sangha	Supreme Sangharaja of Thailand	Term of Office	Headquarters
Supreme Sangha of Thailand	Amborn Prasatthapong	2017–present	Bangkok
Supreme Sangha of Thailand	Charoen Khachawat	1989–2013	Bangkok
Supreme Sangha of Thailand	Vasana Nilprapha	1973–1988	Bangkok
Supreme Sangha of Thailand	Pun Sukcharoen	1972–1973	Bangkok
Supreme Sangha of Thailand	Chuan Sirisom	1965–1971	Bangkok
Supreme Sangha of Thailand	Somdet Phra Ariyavangsagatayana (Yoo)	1963–1966	Bangkok
Supreme Sangha of Thailand	Somdet Phra Ariyavangsagatayana (Plod Ketuthat)	1960–1963	Bangkok
Supreme Sangha of Thailand	Somdet Phra Luang Vajirayanavangsa (Momrajavong Chuen Nobbavong)	1945–1958	Bangkok
Supreme Sangha of Thailand	Somdet Phra Ariyavangsagatayana (Phae)	1938–1944	Bangkok
Supreme Sangha of Thailand	Somdet Kromma Luang Jinavorn Sirivaddhana (Prince Bhujong Jombhunuj)	1921–1937	Bangkok
Supreme Sangha of Thailand	Somdet Phramahasamanachao Kromphraya Vajirananavarorasa (Prince Manusyanag Manob)	1910–1921	Bangkok
Supreme Sangha of Thailand	Somdet Phra Ariyavangsagatayana (Sa Pussadeva)	1893–1899	Bangkok
Supreme Sangha of Thailand	Somdet Krom Phraya Pavares Variyalongkorn (Prince Rurk)	1853–1892	Bangkok
Supreme Sangha of Thailand	Somdet Kromma Phra Paramanuchitchinorot (Prince Vasugri)	1851–1853	Bangkok
Supreme Sangha of Thailand	Somdet Phra Ariyavangsayana (Nag)	1843–1849	Bangkok
Supreme Sangha of Thailand	Somdet Phra Ariyavangsayana (Don)	1822–1842	Bangkok
Supreme Sangha of Thailand	Somdet Phra Ariyavangsayana (Suk)	1820–1822	Bangkok
Supreme Sangha of Thailand	Somdet Phra Ariyavangsayana (Mee)	1816–1819	Bangkok
Supreme Sangha of Thailand	Somdet Phra Ariyavangsayana (Suk)	1794–1816	Bangkok
Supreme Sangha of Thailand	Somdet Phra Ariyavangsayana (Sri)	1782–1794	Bangkok

== Sangha of Vietnam ==
Buddhist Sangha of Vietnam
Sangha of Vietnam	Sangharaja of Vietnam	Term of Office	Headquarters
Sangha of Vietnam	Sangharaja Thích Trí Quảng	2022–present	Hanoi

Unified Buddhist Sangha of Vietnam
Unified Sangha of Vietnam	Unified Sangharaja of Vietnam	Term of Office	Headquarters
Sangha of Vietnam	Sangharaja Thích Quảng Độ	2008–2020	Ho Chi Minh City and Binh Dinh
Sangha of Vietnam	Sangharaja Thích Huyền Quang	2003–2008	Ho Chi Minh City and Binh Dinh
Sangha of Vietnam	Sangharaja Thích Đôn Hậu	1979–1991	Ho Chi Minh City and Binh Dinh
Sangha of Vietnam	Sangharaja Thích Giác Nhiên	1973–1979	Ho Chi Minh City and Binh Dinh
Sangha of Vietnam	Sangharaja Thích Tịnh Khiết	1964–1973	Ho Chi Minh City and Binh Dinh

== See also ==
- Supreme Patriarch of Thailand
- Supreme Patriarch of Cambodia
