= Nikāya =

Pāḷi word meaning "volume"

Nikāya (निकाय) is a Pāli word meaning "volume". It is often used like the Sanskrit word āgama (आगम) to mean "collection", "assemblage", "class" or "group" in both Pāḷi and Sanskrit. It is most commonly used in reference to the Pali Buddhist texts of the Tripitaka namely those found in the Sutta Piṭaka. It is also used to refer to monastic lineages, where it is sometimes translated as a 'monastic fraternity'.

The term Nikāya Buddhism is sometimes used in contemporary scholarship to refer to the Buddhism of the early Buddhist schools.

== Text collections ==
In the Pāli Canon, particularly, the "Discourse Basket" or Sutta Piṭaka, the meaning of nikāya is roughly equivalent to the English collection and is used to describe groupings of discourses according to theme, length, or other categories. For example, the Sutta Piṭaka is broken up into five nikāyas:

- the Dīgha Nikāya, the collection of long (Pāḷi: dīgha) discourses
- the Majjhima Nikāya, the collection of middle-length (majjhima) discourses
- the Samyutta Nikāya, the collection of thematically linked (samyutta) discourses
- the Anguttara Nikāya, the "gradual collection" (discourses grouped by content enumerations)
- the Khuddaka Nikāya, the "minor collection"

In the other early Buddhist schools the alternate term āgama was used instead of nikāya to describe their Sutra Piṭakas. The Āgamas survive for the most part only in Classical Tibetan and Chinese translation. They correspond closely with the Pāḷi nikāyas.

== Monastic divisions ==
Among the Theravāda nations of Southeast Asia and Sri Lanka, nikāya is also used as the term for a monastic division or lineage; these groupings are also sometimes called "monastic fraternities" or "frateries". Nikāyas may emerge among monastic groupings as a result of royal or government patronage (such as the Dhammayuttika Nikāya of Thailand), due to the national origin of their ordination lineage (the Siam Nikāya of Sri Lanka), because of differences in the interpretation of the monastic code, or due to other factors (such as the Amarapura Nikāya in Sri Lanka, which emerged as a reaction to caste restrictions within the Siam Nikāya). These divisions do not rise to the level of forming separate sects within the Theravāda tradition, because they do not typically follow different doctrines or monastic codes, nor do these divisions extend to the laity.

Ordained Buddhist monks by monastic order in Myanmar (2016).
1. Thudhamma 467,025 (87.3%)
2. Shwegyin 50,692 (9.47%)
3. Mahādvāra 6,066 (1.13%)
4. Mūladvāra 3,872 (0.72%)
5. Veḷuvan 3,732 (0.70%)
6. Hngettwin 1,445 (0.27%)
7. Kudo 927 (0.17%)
8. Mahāyin 823 (0.15%)
9. Anaukchaung 645 (0.12%)

In Myanmar, all the monastic orders are called gaing (ဂိုဏ်း) or gaṇa (ဂဏ) instead of nikāya, although some orders include Nikāya (နိကာယ) in addition to Gaing in their names. No new gaings have been allowed other than the nine legally recognized gaings under the 1990 Law Concerning Sangha Organizations. The largest of these is the Thudhamma Gaing, which was founded in the 1800s during the Konbaung dynasty.

== Nikāya Buddhism ==
The term Nikāya Buddhism was coined by Masatoshi Nagatomi as a non-derogatory substitute for Hīnayāna, meaning the early Buddhist schools. Examples of these groups are pre-sectarian Buddhism and the early Buddhist schools. Some scholars exclude pre-sectarian Buddhism when using the term. The term Theravāda refers to Buddhist practices based on these early teachings, as preserved in the Pāli Canon.

== See also ==
- Āgama (Buddhism)
- Early Buddhist schools
- Nikaya Buddhism
- Pāḷi Canon

== Bibliography ==
- Rhys Davids, T.W. & William Stede (eds.) (1921-5). The Pali Text Society’s Pali–English Dictionary. Chipstead: Pali Text Society. A general on-line search engine for the PED is available at http://dsal.uchicago.edu/dictionaries/pali/.
