= Thathanabaing =

Burmese title for heads of religious orders of Buddhism, Anglicanism and Catholicism

Thathanabaing (Burmese: သာသနာပိုင်, ALA-LC: Sāsanāpuiṅ‘, lit. 'Keeper of Religion'), is the Burmese term for a head of a religious order. The title was historically used for the Supreme Patriarch of Buddhist Clergy (Burmese: မဟာသံဃရာဇာ, Pali: Mahāsaṃgharājā) in Burma until 1938. It is still used in Myanmar as the title for the heads of sects (Burmese: ဂဏာဓိပတိ, Pali: Gaṇādhipati) in Theravāda Buddhism, and the episcopal ordinaries (archbishops and bishops) in Anglican Christianity and Catholic Christianity, as well as for the Supreme Patriarch (Pali: Saṅgharāja) of Buddhism from other countries.

== Etymology ==
Thathanabaing in Burmese, သာသနာပိုင် (ALA-LC: Sāsanāpuiṅ‘) lit. 'Keeper of the Sāsana', is the native Burmese rendition of Sangharaja, or formally Mahāsaṃgharājā (မဟာသံဃရာဇာ), which is typically rendered into English as 'Primate', 'Archbishop' or 'Supreme Patriarch.'

The term "Saṃgharājā" was popularly used from the 1300s to 1400s, but lost currency in subsequent centuries. By the Konbaung dynasty, Thathanabaing and Thathanapyu (သာသနာပြု) were frequently used. But both the Samgharaja and Thathanabaing were used in the official title of the supreme patriarch, Mahāsaṃgharājā Thathanabaing Sayadaw (မဟာသံဃရာဇာသာသနာပိုင်ဆရာတော်).

Nowadays, the term Thathanabaing (သာသနာပိုင်) is still used for the head of a religious order. Each of the nine legally sanctioned monastic sects has a Thathanabaing who is also called a Gaṇādhipati (ဂဏာဓိပတိ) in Burmese Pali. The sects often use their names with the word Thathana (သာသနာ, Pali: Sāsanā) in Burmese to refer to the whole sect or regional subordinate bodies.

== Incumbent ==
Chair of the State Saṃgha Mahā Nāyaka Committee
Committee		Title		Holder		Starting date
9th	State Saṃgha Mahā Nāyaka Committee	5th	Chairman of the State Saṃgha Mahā Nāyaka Committee	Thanlyin Mingyaung Sayadaw	Bhaddanta Candimābhivaṃsa	9 March 2024
Gaṇādhipati (Head of Sect)
Gaṇa (Sect)		Title		Holder		Starting date
Sudhammā Sect		(-)	Mahā Saṃgharājā Thathanabaing Sayadaw	vacant		1938
Sudhammā Sect		5th	Chairman of the State Saṃgha Mahā Nāyaka Committee	Thanlyin Mingyaung Sayadaw	Bhaddanta Candimābhivaṃsa	9 March 2024
Shwegyin Nikāya Sect		16th	Shwegyin Thathanabaing, Shwegyin Nikāyādhipati Ukkaṭṭha Mahā Nāyaka Dhamma Senāpati	Sitagu Sayadaw	Bhaddanta Ñāṇissara	21 March 2023
Dhammānudhamma Mahādvāra Nikāya Sect		16th	Mahādvāra Sect Thathanabaing Saṃgharāja Gaṇādhipati Dhamma Senāpati Mahā Nāyaka Guru		Bhaddanta Varasāmi	
Dhammavinayānuloma Mūladvāra Nikāya Sect			Mūladvāra Thathanabaing	Kamma Sayadaw	Bhaddanta Citrañana	2019
A-nauk-chaung Dvāra Sect						
Veḷuvanna Nikāya Sect		15th	Gaṇādhipati Thathanabaing	Paṇḍitāyon Kyaungtaik Sayadaw	Baddanta Paññinda	5 May 2024
Catubhummika Mahāsatipaṭṭhāna Hnget-twin Sect		10th	Gaṇādhipati	Maymyo Sayadaw	Bhaddanta Vijaya	
Gaṇavimut Kudo Sect						
Dhammayutti Nikāya Mahā Yin Sect						

== History ==
Burmese chronicles mention the office of the Sangharaja (Burmese:သင်္ဃရာဇာ, Pali: Saṅgharājā) as old as the Early Pagan kingdom; the chief queen of King Htun Kyit made the Saṅgharājā from Popa leave the monkhood so that he could be crowned as the King Popa Sawrahan (613-640).

The first monk recorded with the title Thathanabaing (Burmese: သာသနာပိုင်, ALA-LC: Sāsanāpuiṅ) is Shin Panthagu who succeeded Shin Arahan as the primate of the Pagan kingdom. Burmese Encyclopedia argues that the title might have been used for Shin Arahan before Shin Panthagu. In the same way, British historians recognize a lineage of primates beginning with Shin Arahan.

Thathanabaing of Burma
- မဟာသံဃရာဇာသာသနာပိုင်ဆရာတော် (Mahāsaṃgharājā Thathanabaing Sayadaw)
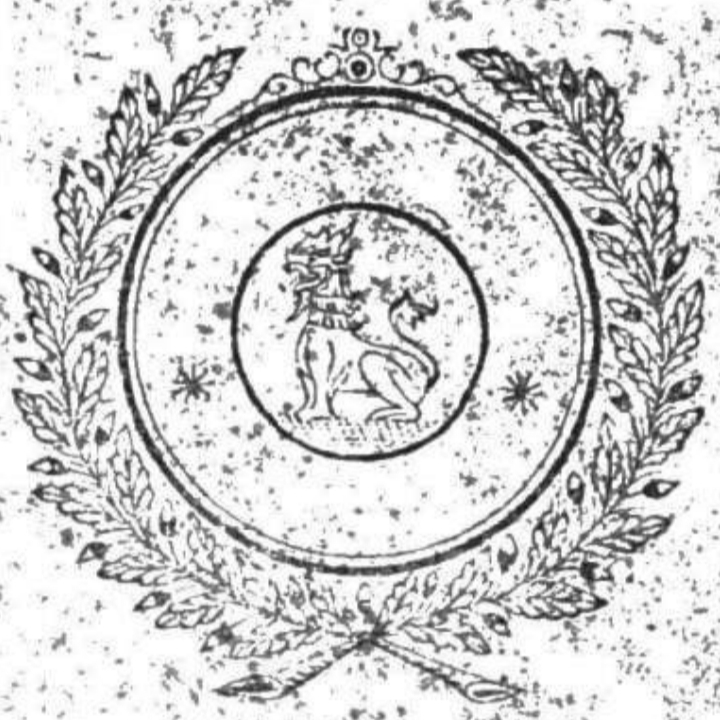
- Seal of the Mahāsaṃgharājā Thathanabaing Sayadaw
- Type: Abolished
- Appointer: * King of Burma (before 1886); Governor of Burma (1886-1938)
- Term length: Lifetime
- Formation: 1056
- First holder: Shin Arahan
- Final holder: Taunggwin Sayadaw
- Abolished: 1938
- Succession: Chairman of State Saṃgha Mahā Nāyaka Committee; Gaṇādhipati (Sect Thathanabaing)

The Mahāsaṃgharājā Thathanabaing Sayadaw (Burmese: မဟာသံဃရာဇာသာသနာပိုင်ဆရာတော်), served as the head of the Buddhist Saṃghā (order of monks) in Burma until 1938 when the Thathanabaing Taunggwin Sayadaw died and the Thudhamma, the only remaining group under his authority decided not to elect a new one. The Thathanabaing was responsible for managing the monastic hierarchy and education at monasteries. The Thathanabaing resided in a royal monastery near the kingdom's capital. However, appointees were usually commoners born in the villages, with no blood relationship with the royal house. Their appointments were made on the basis of their mastery of Buddhist knowledge and literature.

=== Konbaung dynasty ===
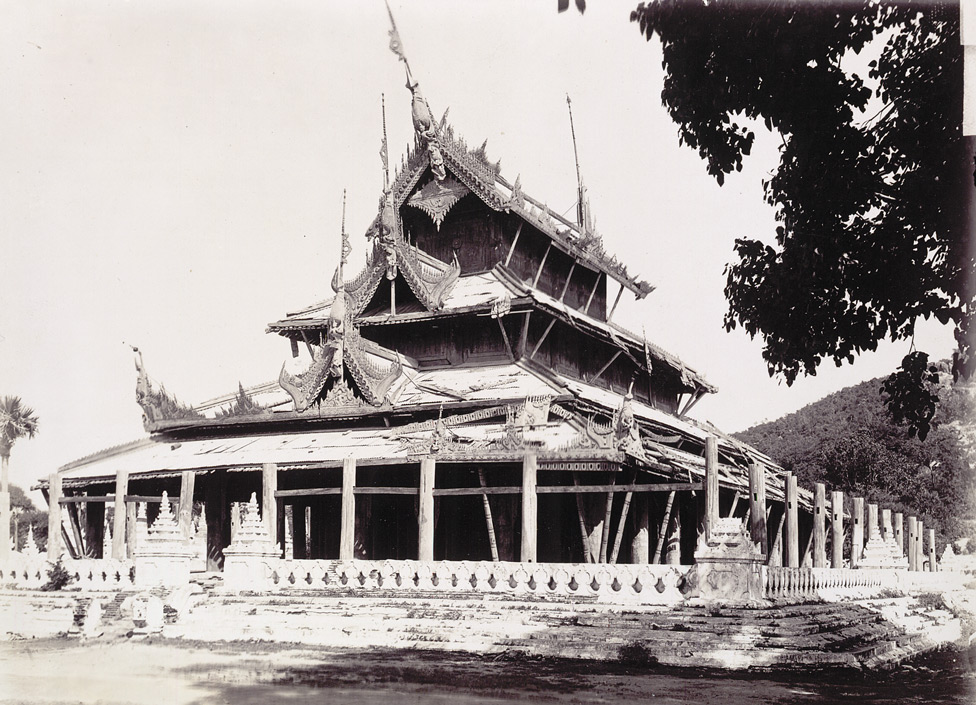
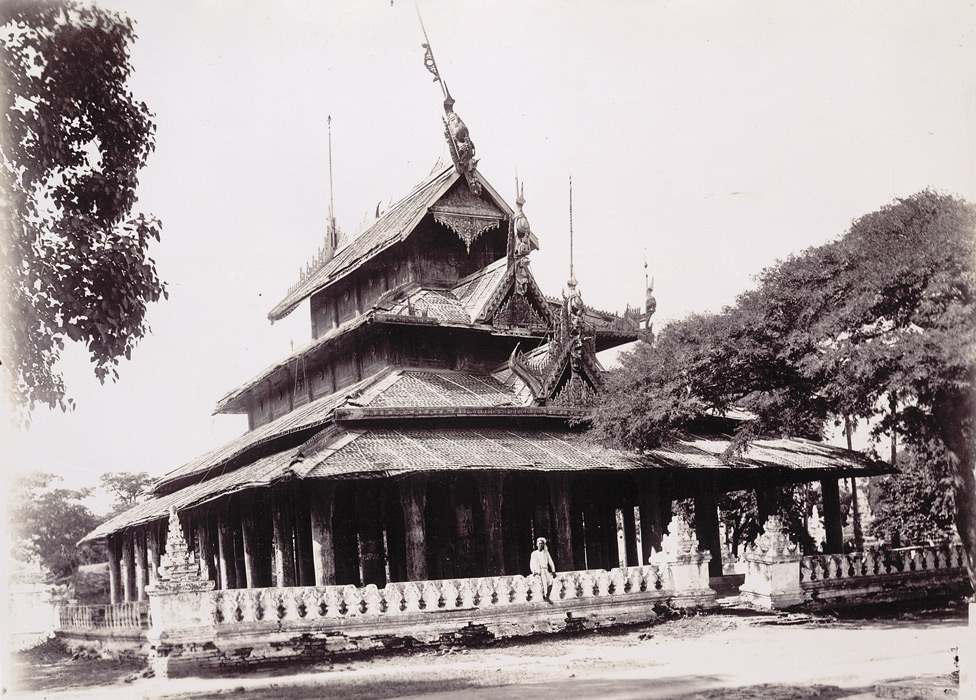
The election of the Thathanapaing in 1902 was held at the Thudhamma and Pahtan Zayats near Mandalay Hill.

The office, in its last incarnation, was established by King Bodawpaya in 1784, after the constitution of the Sudhamma Council, a council of four elder monks (thera), of which the Thathanabaing was its head. Subsequent monarchs expanded the council, which varied from 8 to 12 members called sadaw. Council members were appointed by the king and styled Dazeitya Sayadaw (တံဆိပ်ရဆရာတော်, 'Teachers Possessing the Seal').

The Thathanabaing was appointed by the king and granted supreme authority with regard to religious doctrine and ecclesiastical administration. The Thathanapaing was responsible for the kingdom's religious affairs, including appointment of monastery abbots, monk orders according to the Vinaya, management of breaches of discipline, preparation of an annual report of the order, and administration of Pali examinations.

The Thathanabaing was charged with managing the functions of two government officials, the Mahadan Wun (မဟာဒါန်ဝန်, Ecclesiastical Censor), who oversaw the king's charitable functions, ensured monk compliance with the Vinaya, and submitted registers of all active novices and monks, and the Wutmye Wun (ဝတ်မြေဝန်), who managed the wuttukan-designated religious properties (ဝတ္ထုကံမြေ), including donated land and pagodas. The Burmese kingdom was divided into ecclesiastical jurisdictions, each of which was overseen by a gaing-gyok. Underneath each gaing-gyok was a number of gaing-ok, who were in turn assisted by a number of gaing-dauk. Ecclesiastical disputes were settled by the gaing-gyok and decisions for appeal were made by the Sudhamma Council. Since the breakaway of Shwegyin Sect (which appointed its own Shwegyin Thathanabaing), the Thathanabaing of Burma had power only on the Thudhamma Sect.

=== Colonial rule ===
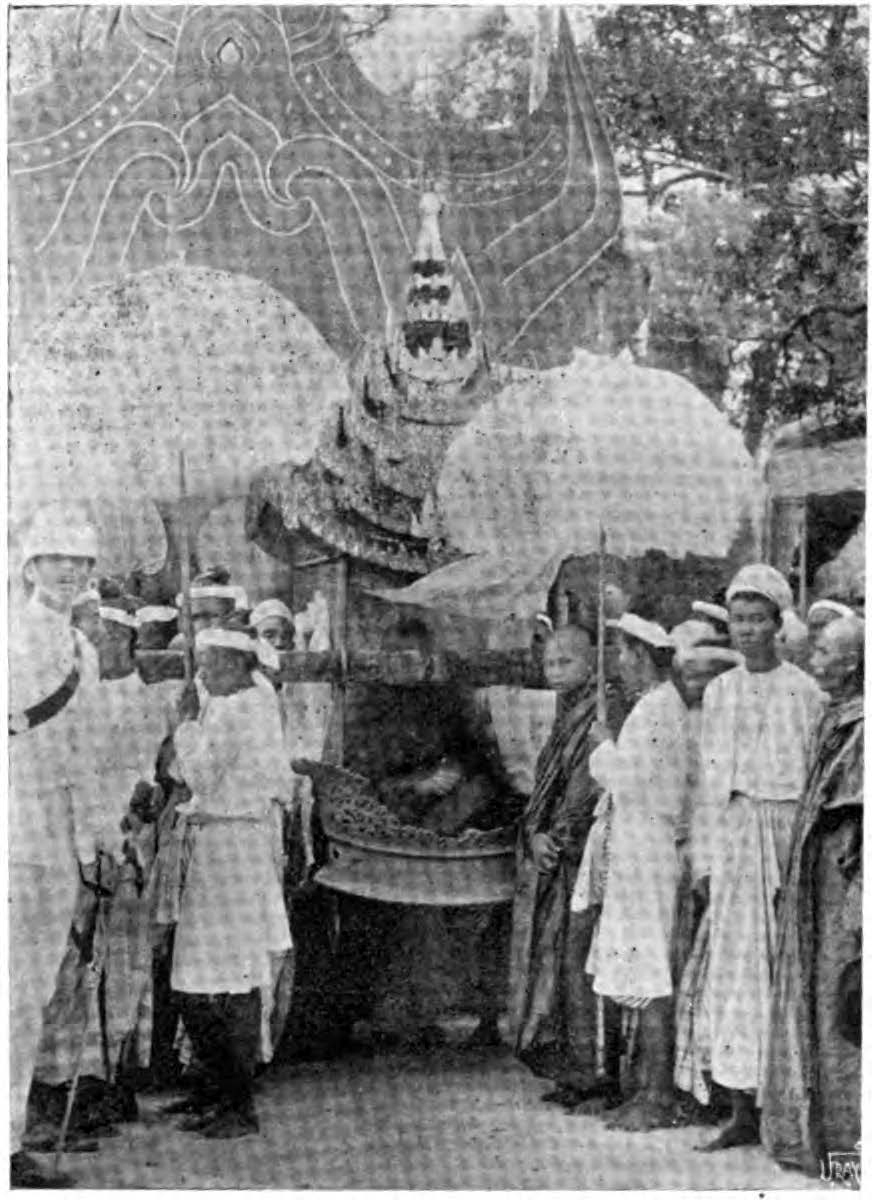
Procession of the Taunggwin Sayadaw at his installation as Thathanabaing of Upper Burma in 1903

In 1895, soon after the abdication of the country's last king, Thibaw Min, the Taungdaw Sayadaw, then the Thathanapaing of Burma, died. A subsequent election elected the Pakhan Sayadaw as Thathanabaing-elect, although the British refused to acknowledge or recognize his title.

In 1903, the lieutenant-governor of British Burma, Hugh Shakespear Barnes, reinstated the title by sanad charter, giving the Thathanapaing nominal authority over internal administration of the Sangha in Upper Burma and over Buddhist ecclesiastical law. (Lower Burma, which had been annexed in 1852, remained without a religious head.) The Taunggwin Sayadaw was appointed, but the position was abolished after his death and no successor was ever appointed. The authority of Thathanabaing, which had already been limited only on the Thudhamma Gaing, was carried on by the Maha Nayaka Sayadaws. Other sects has continued to appoint their own Thathanabaings.

=== Since 1980 ===
Chairman of the State Saṃgha Mahā Nāyaka Committee
- နိုင်ငံတော်သံဃမဟာနာယကအဖွဲ့ဥက္ကဋ္ဌ
- Type: Current
- Appointer: Ministry of Religious Affairs & Culture
- Term length: Lifetime
- Formation: c. 1980
- First holder: Bago Myoma Sayadaw
- Website: https://www.mahana.org.mm

The Chairman of the State Samgha Maha Nayaka Committee (Burmese: နိုင်ငံတော်သံဃမဟာနာယကအဖွဲ့ဥက္ကဋ္ဌ, ALA-LC: Nuiṅṅaṃto‘ Saṃgha Mahā Nāyaka Aphvai' Ukkaṭṭha, lit. 'Chairman of the Great Leader Group of Clergy of the State') is the supreme head of Buddhist monks in Myanmar.

On May 24, 1980, the State Saṃgha Mahā Nāyaka Committee was formed as an official agency of the Government of Myanmar, tasked with essentially the same roles and responsibilities as those of the pre-schism Mahāsaṃgharājā Thathanabaing Sayadaw to lead the Saṃgha of all sects and orders. The Chairman of SSMNC also has to serve as the Gaṇādhipati of Thudhamma Gaing.

== List of Mahasamgharaja Thathanabaings ==
=== Pagan Kingdom ===
1. Shin Arahan
2. Panthagu Sayadaw
3. Shin Uttarajiva
4. Shin Siha Maha Upali

=== Kingdom of Ava ===
1. Yakhaing Sayadaw
2. Amyint Sayadaw
3. Padugyi Samgharaja

=== Konbaung dynasty ===
1. Atula Sayadaw
2. Taungdwingyi Sayadaw
3. Sayit Sayadaw
4. Ashin Thapon
5. Hteintabin Sayadaw
6. Manle Sayadaw
7. Min-o Sayadaw
8. Zonta Sayadaw
9. Minywa Sayadaw
10. Maungdaung Sayadaw
11. Salin Sayadaw
12. The-in Sayadaw
13. Maungdaung Sayadaw
14. Bagaya Sayadaw
15. Maungdaung Sayadaw
16. Taungdaw Sayadaw

=== British rule ===
1. Moda Sayadaw
2. Taunggwin Sayadaw

== List of chairmen of the State Samgha Maha Nayaka Committee ==
1. Indācāra (Bago Myoma Sayadaw): 1980-1993
2. Sobhita (Myingyan Sayadaw): 1994-2004
3. Kumara (Magwe Sayadaw): 2004-2010
4. Kumārābhivaṃsa (Banmaw Sayadaw): 2010-2024
5. Candimābhivaṃsa (Thanlyin Mingyaung Sayadaw): 2024–present

== List of Ganadhipati Thathanabaings ==
=== Shwegyin Sect ===
The following are the Sayadaws who have served as the Shwegyin Thathanabaing (Shwegyin Gaṇādhipati/ Shwegyin Nikāyādhipati Ukkaṭṭha Mahā Nāyaka) from the time of King Mindon.

Serial number	Title	Popular name	Monk name	Start of duty	End of duty
Pathama (First)	Shwegyin Thathanabaing, Shwegyin Gaṇasamuṭṭhāpaka	Shwegyin Sayadaw	Bhaddanta Jāgara	1868	1893
Dutiya (Second)	Shwegyin Thathanabaing, Shwegyin Nikāyādhipati Ukkaṭṭha Mahā Nāyaka Dhammasenāpati	Mahāvisuddhārāma Sayadaw	Bhaddanta Visuddhācāra	1894	1916
Tatiya (Third)	Shwegyin Thathanabaing, Shwegyin Nikāyādhipati Ukkaṭṭha Mahā Nāyaka Dhammasenāpati	Kyaikkasan Sayadaw	Bhaddanta Uttama	1916	1917
Tatiya (Third)	Shwegyin Thathanabaing, Shwegyin Nikāyādhipati Ukkaṭṭha Mahā Nāyaka Dhammasenāpati	Dipeyin Sayadaw	Bhaddanta Ñānavara	1916	1927
Catuttha (Fourth)	Shwegyin Thathanabaing, Shwegyin Nikāyādhipati Ukkaṭṭha Mahā Nāyaka Dhammasenāpati	Alon Sayadaw	Bhaddanta Tissa	1917	1928
Pañcama (Fifth)	Shwegyin Thathanabaing, Shwegyin Nikāyādhipati Ukkaṭṭha Mahā Nāyaka Dhammasenāpati	Chanthagyi Sayadaw	Bhaddanta Jalinda	1929	1932
Chaṭṭhama (Sixth)	Shwegyin Thathanabaing, Shwegyin Nikāyādhipati Ukkaṭṭha Mahā Nāyaka Dhammasenāpati	Hladawgyi Sayadaw	Bhaddanta Rājinda a.k.a. Rādha	1933	1934
Sattama (Seventh)	Shwegyin Thathanabaing, Shwegyin Nikāyādhipati Ukkaṭṭha Mahā Nāyaka Dhammasenāpati	Kyaiklat Pacchimāyon Sayadaw	Bhaddanta Kolāsa	1934	1949
Aṭṭhama (Eighth)	Shwegyin Thathanabaing, Shwegyin Nikāyādhipati Ukkaṭṭha Mahā Nāyaka Dhammasenāpati	Kanni Sayadaw	Bhaddanta Kosalla	1949	1950
Navama (Nine)	Shwegyin Thathanabaing, Shwegyin Nikāyādhipati Ukkaṭṭha Mahā Nāyaka Dhammasenāpati	Sangin Sayadaw	Bhaddanta Candābhivaṃsa	1951	1972
Dasama (Tenth)	Shwegyin Thathanabaing, Shwegyin Nikāyādhipati Ukkaṭṭha Mahā Nāyaka Dhammasenāpati	Myaungmya Sayadaw	Bhaddanta Ñānābhivaṃsa	1973	1975
Ekādasama (Eleventh)	Shwegyin Thathanabaing, Shwegyin Nikāyādhipati Ukkaṭṭha Mahā Nāyaka Dhammasenāpati	Kyemyin Sayadaw	Bhaddanta Jotayābhivaṃsa	1976	1989
Dvādasama (Twelfth)	Shwegyin Thathanabaing, Shwegyin Nikāyādhipati Ukkaṭṭha Mahā Nāyaka Dhammasenāpati	Shwehintha Sayadaw	Bhaddanta Panḍitasīri	1990	1995
Terasama (Thirteenth)	Shwegyin Thathanabaing, Shwegyin Nikāyādhipati Ukkaṭṭha Mahā Nāyaka Dhammasenāpati	Nyaungshwe Kangyi Sayadaw	Bhaddanta Vimalābhivaṃsa	1996	2003
Cuddasama (Fourteenth)	Shwegyin Thathanabaing, Shwegyin Nikāyādhipati Ukkaṭṭha Mahā Nāyaka Dhammasenāpati	Wazo Sayadaw	Bhaddanta Agghiya	2004	2016
Pannarasama (Fifteenth)	Shwegyin Thathanabaing, Shwegyin Nikāyādhipati Ukkaṭṭha Mahā Nāyaka Dhammasenāpati	Vijjotāyon Sayadaw	Bhaddanta Vijjota	2017	2021
Soḷasama (Sixteenth)	Shwegyin Thathanabaing, Shwegyin Nikāyādhipati Ukkaṭṭha Mahā Nāyaka Dhammasenāpati	Sītagū Sayadaw	Bhaddanta Ñāṇissara	2021	present

=== Mahādvāra Sect ===
The following are the Sayadaws who have served as Mahādvāra Sect Thathanabaing.

Serial number	Title	Popular name	Monk name	Start of duty	End of duty
Pathama (First)	Gaṇādhipati, Gaṇasamuṭṭhāpaka, Ādikammika Puggalavisesa, Dvāra Thathanabaing	Okpho Sayadaw	Ukkaṃvaṃsamālā	1852	1905
Dutiya (Second)	Thathanabaing, Dhammavaṃsasenāpati Gaṇissara Mahā Nāyaka Guru, Saṃghadattiya	Hinthada Town, Yangon Kyaungtaik Sayadaw	Sīrimālā	1918	1921
Tatiya (Third)	Thathanabaing, Mahā Nāyaka Guru	Zalun Town, Mahānāgavaṃsa Kyaungtaik Sayadaw	Sīricandā	1922	1935
Catuttha (Fourth)	Thathanabaing, Gaṇissara Mahā Nāyaka Guru	Hinthada Town, Ledi Kyaungtaik Sayadaw	Sīrirājinda	1936	1941
Pañcama (Fifth)	Thathanabaing, Mahā Dhammasenāpati Gaṇādhigaṇa Guru	Hinthada Town, Phayagyi Kyaungtaik Sayadaw	Cārindāsabha	1942	1956
Caṭṭhama (Sixth)	Thathanabaing, Dhammasenāpati Mahā Nāyaka Guru	Hinthada Town, Yedagun Kyaungtaik Sayadaw	Sīrikelāvaṃsa	1956	1962
Sattama (Seventh)	Thathanabaing, Dhammasenāpati Mahā Nāyaka Guru	Hinthada Town, Yedagun Kyaungtaik Sayadaw	Candasīri	1962	1972
Aṭṭhama (Eighth)	Thathanabaing, Dhammasenāpati Mahā Nāyaka Guru	Hinthada Town, Thabyebin Kyaungtaik Sayadaw	Sobana	1972	1977
Navama (Nineth)	Thathanabaing, Dhammasēnāpati Mahā Nāyaka Guru, Saṃghadattiya	Yangon Division, Sanchaung Township, Linlunbin Kyaungtaik Sayadaw	Vāsudeva	1972	

=== Mūladvāra Sect ===
The following are the Sayadaws who have served as Mūladvāra Mahā Nāyaka Thathanabaing.

Serial number	Title	Popular name	Monk name	Start of duty	End of duty
Pathama (First)	Gaṇādhipati, Gaṇasamuṭṭhāpaka, Ādikammika Puggalavisesa, Dvāra Thathanabaing	Okpho Sayadaw	Ukkaṃvaṃsamālā	1852	1905
Dutiya (Second)	Mūladvāra Thathanabaing, Mūladvāra Mahā Nāyaka	Latpadan Town, Mahābodhivan Sayadaw			
Tatiya (Third)	Mūladvāra Thathanabaing, Mūladvāra Mahā Nāyaka	Pathein Town, Migadhāvun Sayadaw			
Catuttha (Fourth)	Mūladvāra Thathanabaing, Mūladvāra Mahā Nāyaka	Hteindaw Town, Ywama Kyaung Sayadaw			
Pañcama (Fifth)	Mūladvāra Thathanabaing, Mūladvāra Mahā Nāyaka	Ingapu Town, Ingapu Kyaung Sayadaw			
Caṭṭhama (Sixth)	Mūladvāra Thathanabaing, Mūladvāra Mahā Nāyaka	Pantaung Sayadaw			
Caṭṭhama (Sixth)	Mūladvāra Thathanabaing, Mūladvāra Mahā Nāyaka	4 other sayadaws (unknown)			
Sattama (Seventh)	Mūladvāra Thathanabaing, Mūladvāra Mahā Nāyaka	Pyay Town, Kandwin Sayadaw			
Sattama (Seventh)	Mūladvāra Thathanabaing, Mūladvāra Mahā Nāyaka	9 other sayadaws, including, Ingapu Town, Dhammasukha Sayadaw			
Aṭṭhama (Eighth)	Mūladvāra Thathanabaing, Mūladvāra Mahā Nāyaka	Hinthada Town, Chanthagyi Kyaung Sayadaw			
Aṭṭhama (Eighth)	Mūladvāra Thathanabaing, Mūladvāra Mahā Nāyaka	15 other sayadaws (unknown)			

=== Anaukchaung Dvāra Sect ===
The following are the Sayadaws who have served as Nāyaka the head of sect.

Serial number	Title	Popular name	Monk name	Start of duty	End of duty
	Six Anaukchaung Dvāra Sayadaws	Yegyi Myoyo Sayadaw	Bhaddanta Kesara		
	Six Anaukchaung Dvāra Sayadaws	Gwinlya Sayadaw	Bhaddanta Silvaṃsa		
	Six Anaukchaung Dvāra Sayadaws	Ngatheinchaung Town, Kyagyi Sayadaw	Bhaddanta Kalyāṇa		
	Six Anaukchaung Dvāra Sayadaws	Mezali Sayadaw	Bhaddanta Dhammacārī		
	Six Anaukchaung Dvāra Sayadaws	Athote Town, Dakkhiṇāyon Sayadaw	Bhaddanta Nandiya		
	Six Anaukchaung Dvāra Sayadaws	Kyaukchaung Village, Shweyaungbya Sayadaw	Bhaddanta Nandimā		
	Head of Sect, Nāyaka	Ayeyarwady Division, Yegyi Township, Ngathaingchaung Town, Phayagyi Taik Sayadaw	Bhaddanta Dhammavaṃsa		

=== Veḷuvan Sect ===
The following are the Sayadaws who have served as Veḷuvan Sammutti Thathanabaing.

Serial number	Title	Popular name	Monk name	Start of duty	End of duty
Pathama (First)	Leading Chairman, Padhāna Mahā Nāyakādhipati	Kyaikto Town, Phayagyi Kyaungtaikp Sayadaw	Baddhanta Visuddha	1919	
Dutiya (Second)	Veḷuvan Gaṇāsammuṭṭhāpaka, Veḷuvan Nikāya Mahā Nāyakādhipati	Veḷuvan Sayadaw	Baddhanta Paṇḍavaṃsa	1940	
Tutiya (Third)	Mahā Nāyakādhipati	Thaton Town, Candāyon Sayadaw	Baddhanta Āciṇṇa	1953	
Catuttha (Fourth)	Mahā Nāyakādhipati	Pathein Town, Veḷuvan Sayadaw	Baddhanta Sāgara	1963	
Pañcama (Fifth)	Nāyakādhipati	Pyay Town, Pwint Hla Thein Gon Kyaungtaik Sayadaw	Baddhanta Tikkha	1969	
Chaṭṭhama (Sixth)	Mahā Nāyakādhipati, Veḷuvan Sammutti Thathanabaing	Mon State, Chaungzon Township, Mayan Village, Sanchaung Taik Sayadaw	Baddhanta Vimalācara	1980	

=== Hngettwin Sect ===
The following are the Sayadaws who have served as the Gaṇādhipati of the Catubhummika Mahāsatipaṭṭhān Hngettwin Sect.

Serial number	Title	Popular name	Monk name	Start of duty	End of duty
Pathama (First)		Hngettwin Sayadaw	Baddhanta Paṇḍava	1888	1910
Dutiya (Second)	Gaṇādhipati	Kungyangon Sayadaw	Baddhanta Jotābhidhaja	1910	
Dutiya (Third)	Gaṇādhipati	Nanyaw Sayadaw	Baddhanta Jāgara		1969
Catuttha (Fourth)	Gaṇādhipati	Zidaw Sayadaw	Baddhanta Āsabha	1969	

=== Mahāyin Sect ===
The following are the Sayadaws who have served as the Nikāyādhipati Sammuti Saṃgharājā of the Dhammayutti Nikāya Mahāyi Sect.

Serial number	Title	Popular name	Monk name	Start of duty	End of duty
Pathama (First)		Mahāyin Sayadaw	Baddhanta Buddhavaṃsa		
Dutiya (Second)			Baddhanta Ñānasīri		
Tatiya (Third)			Baddhanta Moggaliputta		
Catuttha (Fourth)		Muyitgalay Sayadaw	Baddhanta Nālāgīri		
Pañcama (Fifth)			Baddhanta Mahinda		
Chaṭṭhama (Sixth)		Winyawzeikgyi Tawya(Forest) Sayadaw	Baddhanta Jotipāla		

== See also ==
- Agga Maha Pandita
- Buddhism in Myanmar
- Mahanayaka
- Sangharaja
- Sangha Supreme Council, Thailand
- State Samgha Maha Nayaka Committee
- Supreme Patriarch of Cambodia
- Supreme Patriarch of Thailand
- Burmese Buddhist titles
- Buddhist sects in Myanmar
