= Vijjota =

Burmese Buddhist monk (1930–2022)

Bhaddanta Vijjota Maha Thera
- ဝိဇ္ဇောတမဟာထေရ်
- Title: Abhidhaja Agga Mahā Saddhamma Jotika (2021); Abhidhaja Mahā Raṭṭha Guru (2018); Agga Mahā Paṇḍita (1993); Agga Mahā Ganthavācaka Paṇḍita (1992)

Personal life
- Born: 5 March 1930 Mudon Township, Mon State, Burma, British Raj
- Died: 20 March 2022 (aged 92) Yangon, Myanmar

Religious life
- Religion: Buddhism
- Temple: Vijjotāyon Pariyatti Monastery
- School: Theravada
- Sect: Shwekyin Nikāya
- Dharma names: Vijjota

Senior posting
- Period in office: 2017 – 2022 (Thathanabaing of Shwekyin Nikāya)
- Predecessor: Waso Sayadaw

Bhaddanta Vijjota Mahā Thera (Burmese: ဘဒ္ဒန္တဝိဇ္ဇောတမဟာထေရ်; 5 March 1930 – 20 March 2022), commonly known as Vijjotārum Sayadaw (also Vijjotāyon Sayadaw; Burmese: ဝိဇ္ဇောတာရုံဆရာတော်), was a Burmese Buddhist monk. He was the 15th Thathanabaing (the equivalent of the Supreme Patriarch) and Mahanayaka of the Shwekyin Nikaya of Myanmar, from 2017 to his death in 2022. Chief abbot of Vijjotāyon Pariyatti Monastery in Mayangon Township, the mahathera was a State Ovādācariya Sayadaw (lit. 'Guiding acariya of the country').

== Biography ==
The mahathera served as lecturer at Pajjotāyon Monastery in Myaungmya, vinayadhara and chairperson of Sangha Nayaka Committee of the nikaya of Mayangon Township, ovādācariya of Kaba Aye Pagoda, and associate head of vinaya-byan department of the nikaya. At the 19th Shwekyin Nikaya Sangha Conference held in 2015, the mahathera, alongside Madaya Thahtay Sayadaw and Sitagu Sayadaw, was appointed an upaukkaṭṭha (associate thathanabaing), and upon the death of Waso Sayadaw, the 14th thathanabaing, on 14 February 2017, he became the 15th thathanabaing of the nikaya.

The mahathera was offered, by the Burmese government, the titles of Agga Mahā Ganthavācaka Paṇḍita, Agga Mahā Paṇḍita, Abhidhaja Mahā Raṭṭha Guru, Abhidhaja Agga Mahā Saddhamma Jotika in 1992, 1993, 2018 and 2021 respectively.

The mahathera died on 20 March 2022 in Yangon, at the age of 92.
