= Shwegyin Nikaya =

Buddhist monastic order in Myanmar

- ရွှေကျင်နိကာယ
- Abbreviation: Shwegyin
- Formation: 2 July 1860
- Type: Buddhist monastic order
- Headquarters: Myanmar
- Members: 50,692 (2016)
- Leader: H.H Sitagu Sayadaw Bhaddanta Ñāṇissara, Soḷasama (16th) Shwegyin Thathanabaing
- Key people: Shwegyin Sayadaw U Jāgara

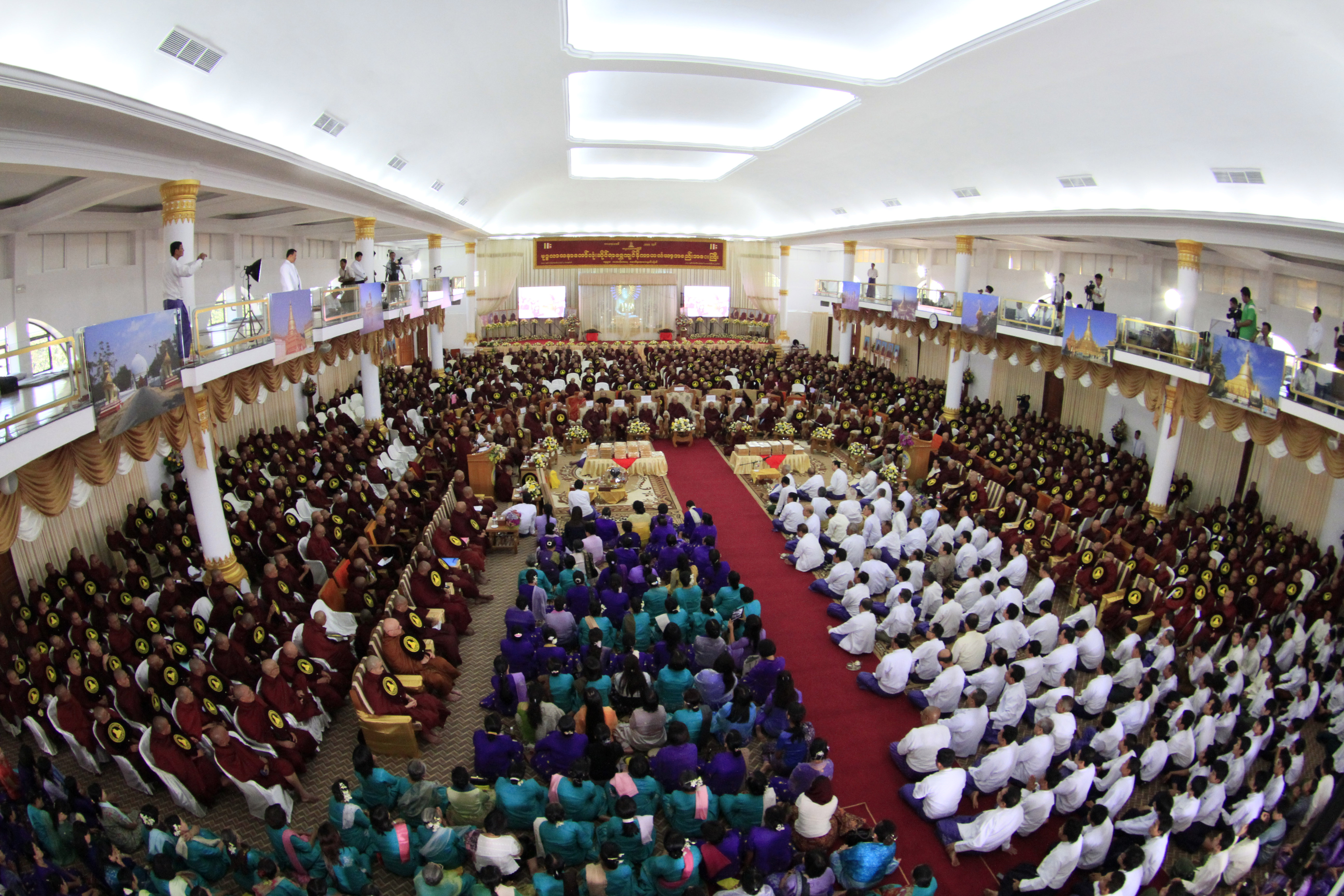
In February 2012, one thousand Buddhist monks and followers gathered for the eighteenth annual Shwekyin Nikaya Conference at the compound of Dhammaduta Zetawon Tawya Monastery in Hmawbi Township, Yangon Region.

Shwegyin Nikāya (Burmese: ရွှေကျင်နိကာယ, MLCTS: Hrwekyang Ni.kaya., IPA: [ʃwèdʑɪ́ɰ̃ nḭkàja̰]; also spelt Shwekyin Nikāya) is the second largest monastic order of monks in Burma. It is one of the nine legally sanctioned monastic orders (Pali: gaṇa) in the country, under the 1990 Law Concerning Sangha Organizations.

== Statistics ==
Ordained Buddhist monks by monastic order in Myanmar (2016).
1. Thudhamma 467,025 (87.3%)
2. Shwegyin 50,692 (9.47%)
3. Mahādvāra 6,066 (1.13%)
4. Mūladvāra 3,872 (0.72%)
5. Veḷuvan 3,732 (0.70%)
6. Hngettwin 1,445 (0.27%)
7. Kudo 927 (0.17%)
8. Mahāyin 823 (0.15%)
9. Anaukchaung 645 (0.12%)

According to 2016 statistics published by the State Sangha Maha Nayaka Committee, 50,692 monks belonged to this monastic order, representing 9.47% of all monks in the country, making it the second largest order after Sudhammā. With respect to geographic representation, the plurality of Shwegyin monks live in Yangon Region (23.66%), followed by Sagaing Region (17.47%), Bago Region (16.58%), and Mandalay Region (13.98%). In 2016, the order had 3,608 monasteries, representing 6% of the country's monasteries.

== Doctrine ==
Shwegyin Nikaya is a more orthodox order than Thudhamma Gaing, with respect to adherence to the Vinaya, and its leadership is more centralised and hierarchical.

== Leadership ==
Shwegyin Nikaya is led by a Thathanabaing with the title Shwegyin Thathanabaing Shwegyin Nikāyādhipati Ukkaṭṭha Mahā Nāyaka Dhammasenāpati (ရွှေကျင်သာသနာပိုင် ရွှေကျင်နိကာယာဓိပတိဥက္ကဋ္ဌ မဟာနာယကဓမ္မသေနာပတိ) whose authority on doctrine and religious practice is considered absolute. Sitagu Sayadaw Ashin Ñānissara is the incumbent Shwegyin Thathanabaing.

The Thathanabaing is assisted by four Associate Thathanabaings with the title Associate Shwegyin Thathanabaing Shwegyin Nikāya Upa Ukkaṭṭha Mahā Nāyaka (ရွှေကျင်သာသနာပိုင် ရွှေကျင်နိကာယ ဥပဥက္ကဋ္ဌ မဟာနာယက) Currently, the Rector Sayadaw Ashin Nandamālābhivaṁsa is the only surviving one, among the four Associate Shwegyin Thathanabaings appointed in 2018.

== History ==
The sect was founded in 1860 by Ashin Zagara, a chief abbot monk in the village of Shwegyin (translated into English as Gold or Suvaṇṇa into Pāḷi); hence, its name. It formally separated from the Thudhamma Gaing during the reign of King Mindon Min, and attempts to reconcile the two sects by the last king of Burma, Thibaw Min, were unsuccessful.

The Shwegyin sect emerged as a response to King Mindon’s centralised control over the Sangha via the Thudhamma Council. After clashing with Saṃgha authorities, the Shwegyin Sayadaw secured royal approval to remain independent from the Thathanabaing of Burma and Thudhamma Council. King Thibaw offered the Shwegyin Sayadaw the title of Thathanabaing in parallel to that of the Thathanabaing of Burma of Thudhamma Gaing. Known for their strict adherence to Vinaya, Shwegyin monks distinguished themselves from the more lenient Thudhamma majority, reflecting broader religious divisions shaped by colonial influence.

Under British colonial rule, the group gradually formalised its structure to preserve its identity amid the loss of monarchical support. By 1920, the Shwegyin monks held their first official meeting, asserting their autonomy while still recognising the Thudhamma Council. They established their own administrative system, court, monk registry, and historical records. Their leader, the Shwegyin Thathanabaing, functioned similarly to the Thathanabaing of Thudhamma Council, overseeing organisation, discipline, and doctrinal matters, effectively creating an independent, self-governing monastic body.

Monks of the order did not participate in the nationalist and anti-colonial movement in British Burma of the early 1900s. In the 1960s, with the ascent of Ne Win to power, the order gained monastic influence in the country, as Ne Win sought counsel from a monk at the Mahagandayon Monastery, a Shwegyin monastery in Amarapura. During the 2021 Myanmar protests, the order urged Senior General Min Aung Hlaing to immediately cease the assaults on unarmed civilians and to refrain from engaging in theft and property destruction. Its leading monks reminded the Senior General to be a good Buddhist, which entailed keeping to the Five Precepts required for at least a human rebirth. (Note: This letter, released in March, gained notoriety for the discrepancies between its signed original draft and its final version, the latter which appears to have legitimized Min Aung Hlaing's rule through a veiled reference to him as king. The Burmese word for 'king', min (Burmese: မင်း, MLCTS: mang:), coincides with the first syllable of the general's name, even in the Burmese script.)

== List of Shwegyin Thathanabaings ==
The following are the Sayadaws who have served as the Shwegyin Thathanabaing (Shwegyin Gaṇādhipati/ Shwegyin Nikāyādhipati Ukkaṭṭha Mahā Nāyaka) from the time of King Mindon.

Serial number	Title	Popular name	Monk name	Start of duty	End of duty
Paṭhama (First)	Shwegyin Thathanabaing, Shwegyin Gaṇasamuṭṭhāpaka	Shwegyin Sayadaw	Bhaddanta Jāgara	1868	1893
Dutiya (Second)	Shwegyin Thathanabaing, Shwegyin Nikāyādhipati Ukkaṭṭha Mahā Nāyaka Dhammasenāpati	Mahāvisuddhārāma Sayadaw	Bhaddanta Visuddhācāra	1894	1916
Tatiya (Third)	Shwegyin Thathanabaing, Shwegyin Nikāyādhipati Ukkaṭṭha Mahā Nāyaka Dhammasenāpati	Kyaikkasan Sayadaw	Bhaddanta Uttama	1916	1917
Tatiya (Third)	Shwegyin Thathanabaing, Shwegyin Nikāyādhipati Ukkaṭṭha Mahā Nāyaka Dhammasenāpati	Dipeyin Sayadaw	Bhaddanta Ñānavara	1916	1927
Catuttha (Fourth)	Shwegyin Thathanabaing, Shwegyin Nikāyādhipati Ukkaṭṭha Mahā Nāyaka Dhammasenāpati	Alon Sayadaw	Bhaddanta Tissa	1917	1928
Pañcama (Fifth)	Shwegyin Thathanabaing, Shwegyin Nikāyādhipati Ukkaṭṭha Mahā Nāyaka Dhammasenāpati	Chanthagyi Sayadaw	Bhaddanta Jalinda	1929	1932
Chaṭṭhama (Sixth)	Shwegyin Thathanabaing, Shwegyin Nikāyādhipati Ukkaṭṭha Mahā Nāyaka Dhammasenāpati	Hladawgyi Sayadaw	Bhaddanta Rājinda a.k.a. Rādha	1933	1934
Sattama (Seventh)	Shwegyin Thathanabaing, Shwegyin Nikāyādhipati Ukkaṭṭha Mahā Nāyaka Dhammasenāpati	Kyaiklat Pacchimāyon Sayadaw	Bhaddanta Kolāsa	1934	1949
Aṭṭhama (Eighth)	Shwegyin Thathanabaing, Shwegyin Nikāyādhipati Ukkaṭṭha Mahā Nāyaka Dhammasenāpati	Kanni Sayadaw	Bhaddanta Kosalla	1949	1950
Navama (Nine)	Shwegyin Thathanabaing, Shwegyin Nikāyādhipati Ukkaṭṭha Mahā Nāyaka Dhammasenāpati	Sangin Sayadaw	Bhaddanta Candābhivaṃsa	1951	1972
Dasama (Tenth)	Shwegyin Thathanabaing, Shwegyin Nikāyādhipati Ukkaṭṭha Mahā Nāyaka Dhammasenāpati	Myaungmya Sayadaw	Bhaddanta Ñānābhivaṃsa	1973	1975
Ekādasama (Eleventh)	Shwegyin Thathanabaing, Shwegyin Nikāyādhipati Ukkaṭṭha Mahā Nāyaka Dhammasenāpati	Kyemyin Sayadaw	Bhaddanta Jotayābhivaṃsa	1976	1989
Dvādasama (Twelfth)	Shwegyin Thathanabaing, Shwegyin Nikāyādhipati Ukkaṭṭha Mahā Nāyaka Dhammasenāpati	Shwehintha Sayadaw	Bhaddanta Panḍitasīri	1990	1995
Terasama (Thirteenth)	Shwegyin Thathanabaing, Shwegyin Nikāyādhipati Ukkaṭṭha Mahā Nāyaka Dhammasenāpati	Nyaungshwe Kangyi Sayadaw	Bhaddanta Vimalābhivaṃsa	1996	2003
Cuddasama (Fourteenth)	Shwegyin Thathanabaing, Shwegyin Nikāyādhipati Ukkaṭṭha Mahā Nāyaka Dhammasenāpati	Wazo Sayadaw	Bhaddanta Agghiya	2004	2016
Pannarasama (Fifteenth)	Shwegyin Thathanabaing, Shwegyin Nikāyādhipati Ukkaṭṭha Mahā Nāyaka Dhammasenāpati	Vijjotāyon Sayadaw	Bhaddanta Vijjota	2017	2021
Soḷasama (Sixteenth)	Shwegyin Thathanabaing, Shwegyin Nikāyādhipati Ukkaṭṭha Mahā Nāyaka Dhammasenāpati	Sītagū Sayadaw	Bhaddanta Ñāṇissara	2021	To this day

== See also ==
- Thudhamma Gaing
- Hngettwin Gaing
- Buddhist sects in Myanmar
- Buddhism in Burma
