= Mūladvāra Nikāya =

Buddhist monastic order in Myanmar

Dhammvinayānuloma Mūladvāra Nikāya Sect
- ဓမ္မာဝိနယာနုလောမမူလဒွါရနိကာယဂိုဏ်း
- Abbreviation: မူလဒွါရဂိုဏ်း (Mūladvāra Sect)
- Formation: 1852 (Dvāra Sect, original); 1918 (Mūladvāra Sect)
- Type: Buddhist monastic order
- Headquarters: Myanmar
- Members: 3,872 (2016)
- Leader: H.H. Kamma Sayadaw Bhaddanta Citrañana, Mūladvāra Thathanabaing

Dhammavinayānuloma Mūladvāra Nikāya Gaing (Burmese: ဓမ္မဝိနယာနုလောမမူလဒွါရနိကာယဂိုဏ်း), also known as Mula Dwaya Gaing or Mūla Dvāra Gaing, is a monastic order of the sangha in Buddhism in Myanmar. According to the 1990 Law Relating to the Sangha Organization, it is one of the nine legally recognized monastic orders in the country.

The order was founded by Ingapu Sayadaw after he broke away from the Mahādvāra Nikāya following the death of Okpo Sayadaw, primarily due to disagreements regarding the schedule for observing the uposatha.

== Statistics ==
Ordained Buddhist monks by monastic order in Myanmar (2016).
1. Thudhamma 467,025 (87.3%)
2. Shwegyin 50,692 (9.47%)
3. Mahādvāra 6,066 (1.13%)
4. Mūladvāra 3,872 (0.72%)
5. Veḷuvan 3,732 (0.70%)
6. Hngettwin 1,445 (0.27%)
7. Kudo 927 (0.17%)
8. Mahāyin 823 (0.15%)
9. Anaukchaung 645 (0.12%)

According to 2016 statistics published by the State Samgha Maha Nayaka Committee, 3,872 monks belonged to this monastic order, representing 0.72% of all monks in the country.

== Origins ==
=== Dvāra Gaing ===
In 1214 of the Burmese Era (around 1852 CE), during British rule in the Ayeyarwady Region, Sayadaw Ashin Ukkamsa Vimala from the town of Okpho (now Ingapu township) had a dispute with the Sayadaws of the Sudhammā order (Thudhamma Gaing) who were under British jurisdiction.

This dispute was triggered by the issue of ordination (upasampadā) in a water sīmā (ye sim). Furthermore, Okpho Sayadaw ruled that when paying homage to The Buddha, one should not do so by reciting kāyakamma, vacīkamma, and manokamma (bodily action/karma, verbal action, mental action). According to him, the correct way was to pay homage with the concept of dvāra (door), by reciting kāyadvāra, vacīdvāra, and manodvāra (bodily door, verbal door, mental door). (Note: Currently, this method of paying homage [using dvāra] is no longer found. Almost the entire country pays homage only with kāyakamma, vacīkamma, manokamma.) He also argued that the Sangha could self-regulate without a Dhammarāja if the monks strictly followed the Vinaya (monastic discipline), emphasizing moral intention and challenging royal authority in ordinations.

Kyìthè Layhtat Sayadaw (of the Thudhamma order), author of the Jinattha-pakāsanī, refuted this view on homage, arguing that homage with the concept of kamma (action), rather than dvāra (door), was the correct one. Therefore, in Lower Myanmar, the order formed by Okpho Sayadaw was called the Dvāra Gaing ("Door Order"), while the Thudhamma order was called the Kamma Gaing ("Karma Order"). Later on, however, the name Kamma Gaing fell out of use, and it was again referred to as the Thudhamma Gaing.

These Dvāra orders later split further into 3 types, namely:

- Anaukchaung Dvāra Gaing (Western Stream Dvāra Order)
- Mahādvāra Gaing (Great Dvāra Order)
- Mūladvāra Gaing (Original/Root Dvāra Order)

=== Mūladvāra Gaing ===
In 1918, after Okpo Sayadaw's death, although members of the Mahādvāra order resumed the practice of uposatha on full moon and new moon days along with members of other orders, some members of the Dvāra order continued to perform the uposatha by entering a sima on the first day after the full moon (the 1st day of the waning moon, pāṭipada) and the first day of the new moon (the 1st day of the waxing moon, pāṭipada), in accordance with the principle established by Okpo Sayadaw. Those members of the Mahādvāra who maintained this original or root (mūla) practice were then called Mūla-dvāra (Original Dvāra).

In front of the name Mūla Dvāra, the attribute 'Dhammavinayānuloma' was added, which means "the group that is in accordance with the Dhamma (Sutta and Abhidhamma) and also the Vinaya", thus its full name is called the 'Dhammavinayānuloma Mūla Dvāra Nikāya' order.
