= Mahagandhayon Monastery =

Buddhist monastery in Amarapura, Myanmar

- မဟာဂန္ဓာရုံကျောင်းတိုက်
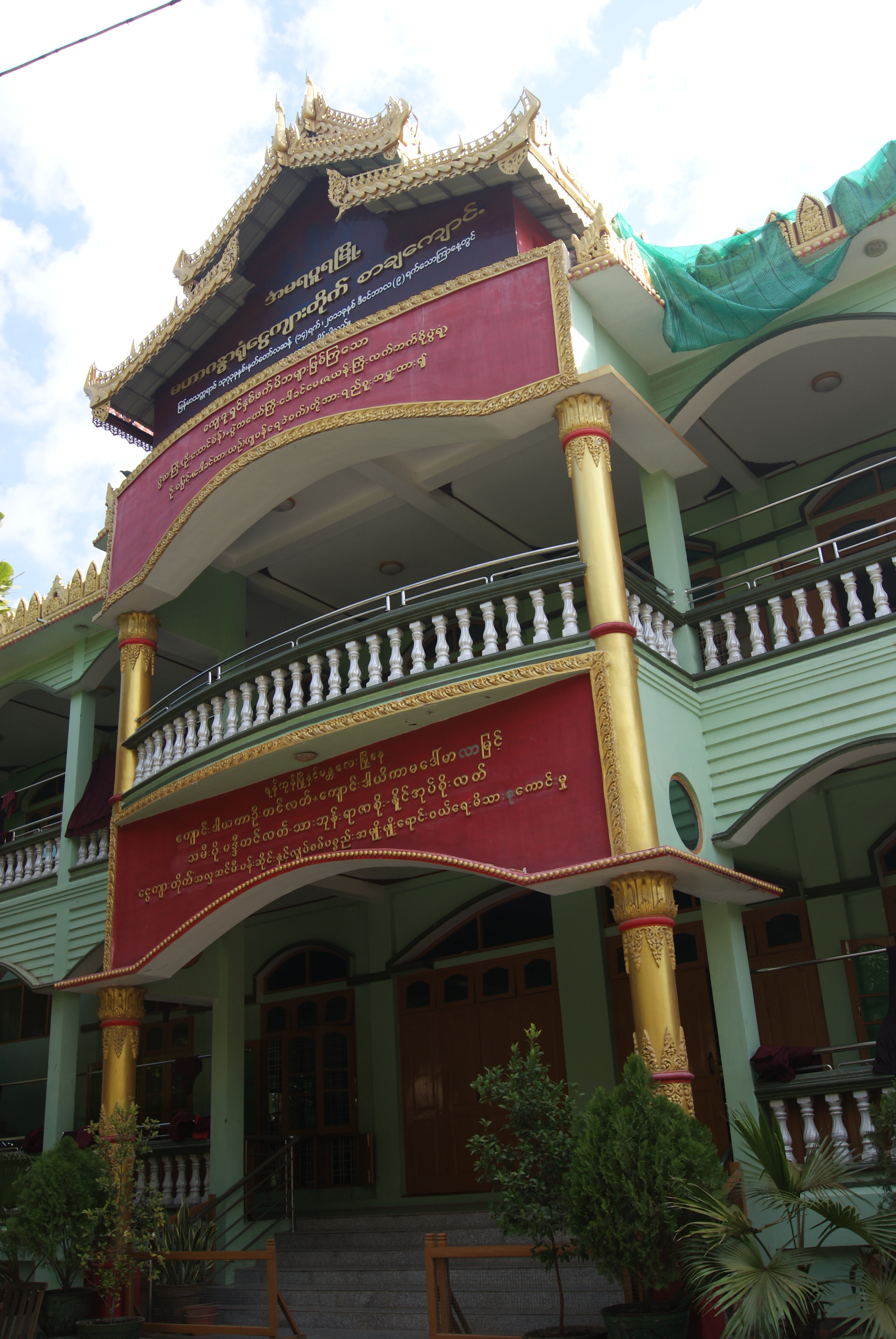

- Location within Myanmar

Religion
- Affiliation: Buddhism
- Sect: Theravada Buddhism
- Region: Mandalay Region
- Status: Active

Location
- Municipality: Amarapura
- Country: Myanmar
- Interactive map of Mahagandhayon Monastery
- Coordinates: 21.896586°N 96.048434°E

Architecture
- Established: 1908; 118 years ago

Mahāgandhāyon Monastery (Burmese: မဟာဂန္ဓာရုံကျောင်းတိုက်; Pali: Mahāgandhārāma Vihāra) is a monastic college located in Amarapura, Myanmar. The monastery is known for its strict adherence to the Vinaya, the Buddhist monastic code.

Buddhist monks in Mahagandhayon Monastery line up barefoot to accept their late morning meal offered by donors.

== History ==
The monastery was first established by Agatithuka Sayadaw, a Thudhamma-affiliated monk around 1908, as a meditation monastery for forest-dwelling monks. The monastery gained further prominence under the leadership of Ashin Janakābhivaṃsa, who began living there in 1914. During the 1970s, Ne Win, the country's leader, sought advice from Shwegyin monks at the monastery.

== See also ==
- Buddhism in Myanmar
- Monastic examinations
- Monastic schools in Myanmar
