= Mahādvāra Nikāya =

Buddhist monastic order in Myanmar

Dhammānudhamma Mahādvāra Nikāya Sect
- ဓမ္မာနုဓမ္မမဟာဒွါရနိကာယဂိုဏ်း
- Abbreviation: မဟာဒွါရဂိုဏ်း (Mahādvāra Sect)
- Formation: 1852 (Dvāra Sect, original); 1918 (Mahādvāra Sect)
- Type: Buddhist monastic order
- Headquarters: Myanmar
- Members: 6,066 (2016)
- Leader: H.H. Latpadan Sayadaw Bhaddanta Varasāmi, 16th Thathanabaing of Mahādvāra Sect

Dhammānudhamma Mahādvāra Nikāya Gaing (Burmese: ဓမ္မာနုဓမ္မမဟာဒွါရနိကာယဂိုဏ်း, also known as Mahā Dwāya Gaing or Mahādvāra Nikāya, is a monastic order of monks in Myanmar (Burma), primarily in Lower Myanmar. This order is very conservative with respect to Vinaya regulations. It is one of the nine legally sanctioned monastic orders in the country, under the 1990 Law Concerning Sangha Organizations.

== Statistics ==
Ordained Buddhist monks by monastic order in Myanmar (2016).
1. Thudhamma 467,025 (87.3%)
2. Shwegyin 50,692 (9.47%)
3. Mahādvāra 6,066 (1.13%)
4. Mūladvāra 3,872 (0.72%)
5. Veḷuvan 3,732 (0.70%)
6. Hngettwin 1,445 (0.27%)
7. Kudo 927 (0.17%)
8. Mahāyin 823 (0.15%)
9. Anaukchaung 645 (0.12%)

According to 2016 statistics published by the State Samgha Maha Nayaka Committee, 6,166 monks belonged to this monastic order, representing 1.15% of all monks in the country, making it the third largest order after Thudhamma and Shwegyin Nikaya. With respect to geographic representation, the majority are based in Lower Burma, with a sizable plurality of Mahādvāra monks living in Ayeyarwady Region (40.69%), followed by Yangon Region (20.65%), Bago Region (20.61%), and Mon State (9.97%).

In 2016, the order had 805 monasteries, representing 1% of the country's monasteries.

== Origins ==
=== Dvāra Gaing ===
In 1214 of the Burmese Era (around 1852 CE), during British rule in the Ayeyarwady Region, Sayadaw Ashin Ukkamsa Vimala from the town of Okpho (now Ingapu township) had a dispute with the Sayadaws of the Sudhammā order (Thudhamma Gaing) who were under British jurisdiction.

This dispute was triggered by the issue of ordination (upasampadā) in a water sīmā (ye sim). Furthermore, Okpho Sayadaw ruled that when paying homage to The Buddha, one should not do so by reciting kāyakamma, vacīkamma, and manokamma (bodily action/karma, verbal action, mental action). According to him, the correct way was to pay homage with the concept of dvāra (door), by reciting kāyadvāra, vacīdvāra, and manodvāra (bodily door, verbal door, mental door). (Note: Currently, this method of paying homage [using dvāra] is no longer found. Almost the entire country pays homage only with kāyakamma, vacīkamma, manokamma.) He also argued that the Sangha could self-regulate without a Dhammarāja if the monks strictly followed the Vinaya (monastic discipline), emphasizing moral intention and challenging royal authority in ordinations.

Kyìthè Layhtat Sayadaw (of the Thudhamma order), author of the Jinattha-pakāsanī, refuted this view on homage, arguing that homage with the concept of kamma (action), rather than dvāra (door), was the correct one. Therefore, in Lower Myanmar, the order formed by Okpho Sayadaw was called the Dvāra Gaing ("Door Order"), while the Thudhamma order was called the Kamma Gaing ("Karma Order"). Later on, however, the name Kamma Gaing fell out of use, and it was again referred to as the Thudhamma Gaing.

These Dvāra orders later split further into 3 types, namely:

- Anaukchaung Dvāra Gaing (Western Stream Dvāra Order)
- Mahādvāra Gaing (Great Dvāra Order)
- Mūladvāra Gaing (Original/Root Dvāra Order)

=== Mahādvāra Gaing ===
For 13 years after the death of Okpho Sayadaw, no one had been elected as a new Mahānāyaka of Dvāra sāsanā. In the year 1280 M.E. (1918-1919 C.E.), the Dvāra Sect held a Sangha meeting which elected the Yangon Monastery Sayadaw from Hinthada as the second Mahānāyaka of Dvāra Sāsanā, and gave the title of "Dhammānudhamma Mahādva Nikāya" to their Dvāra Sect. The majority of Dvāra monks reverted to perform rites on full moon days and new moon days in the Burmese calendar, citing a teaching of Lord Buddha that full moon days and new moon days be determined by the king or the government (rāja padhāna).

== See also ==
- Buddhism in Burma
- Buddhist sects in Myanmar
- Thudhamma Gaing
- Shwegyin Nikaya
- Mūladvāra Nikāya
- Anaukchaung Dvāra Gaing
- Hngettwin Gaing
- Veḷuvan Nikāya
- Kudo Gaing
- Nikaya
- State Samgha Maha Nayaka Committee
