= Thudhamma Gaing =

Buddhist monastic order in Myanmar

Sudhammā Sect
- သုဓမ္မာဂိုဏ်း
- Abbreviation: Thudhammā
- Formation: 1800s
- Type: Buddhist monastic order
- Headquarters: Myanmar
- Members: 467,025 (2016)
- Leader: H.H. Thanlyin Mingyaung Sayadaw Chairman of the State Saṃgha Mahā Nāyaka Committee (Note: The Thathanabaing of Thudhamma Gaing has been formally vacant since 1938; the Chairman of SSMNC is regarded as the Gaṇādhipati of Thudhamma Gaing)

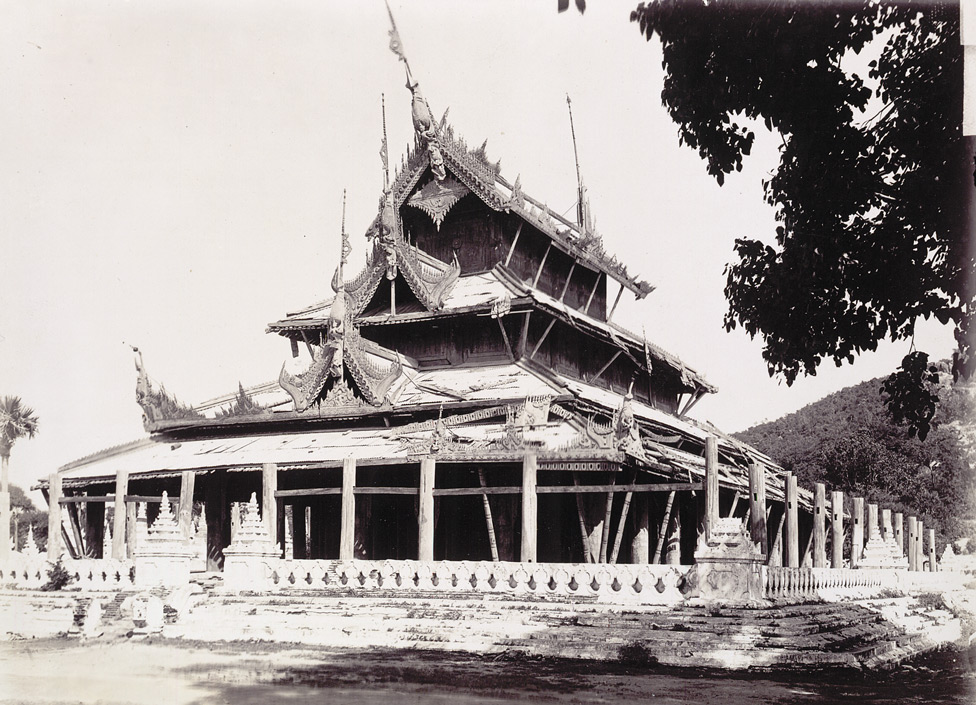
Thudhamma Sect derives its name ultimately from the Thudhamma Zayat, which was the meeting place for the Thudhamma Council.

The Thudhamma Gaing (Burmese: သုဓမ္မာဂိုဏ်း, IPA: [θudəma̰ gáɪɴ]; officially the Sudhammā Sect in English, is the largest monastic order of monks in Burma.

It is one of the nine legally sanctioned monastic orders (Pali: gaṇa) in the country, under the 1990 Law Concerning Sangha Organizations. The Thudhamma is considered a more pragmatic order than the Shwegyin Nikaya, with looser rules regarding Vinaya regulations and is less hierarchical than the former. Like all the major orders in Burma, the Thudhamma Sect prohibits monks from engaging in political activity.

== Statistics ==
Ordained Buddhist monks by monastic order in Myanmar (2016).
1. Thudhamma 467,025 (87.3%)
2. Shwegyin 50,692 (9.47%)
3. Mahādvāra 6,066 (1.13%)
4. Mūladvāra 3,872 (0.72%)
5. Veḷuvan 3,732 (0.70%)
6. Hngettwin 1,445 (0.27%)
7. Kudo 927 (0.17%)
8. Mahāyin 823 (0.15%)
9. Anaukchaung 645 (0.12%)

According to 2016 statistics published by the State Sangha Maha Nayaka Committee, 467,025 monks belonged to this monastic order, representing 87% of all monks in the country. With respect to geographic representation, the plurality of Thudhamma monks live in Mandalay Region (19.76%), followed by Shan State (16.09%), Yangon Region (15.39%), and Sagaing Region (9.88%). In 2016, the order had 56,492 monasteries, representing 90% of the country's monasteries.

== Origins ==
The Thudhamma Sect emerged in the late 18th century, as a result of Sangha reforms by King Bodawpaya, following a long tradition of Burmese kings attempting to purify and unify the Sangha. The order's name Thudhamma comes from the Thudhamma Council (an ecclesiastical organisation founded by Bodawpaya), which in turn is named after Mandalay's Thudhamma Zayats, the meeting grounds for the Council.

The office of the Supreme Patriarch (သာသနာပိုင် or Thathanabaing), similar to the position of Sangharaja in Thailand and Cambodia, dates back to the 13th century, started by the monk Shin Arahan in the Pagan Kingdom. The Thathanabaing was responsible for managing the monastic hierarchy and education at monasteries. In 1782, King Bodawpaya assembled the Thudhamma Council in Amarapura, led by the Thathanapaing and four elders (ထေရ် or thera) to resolve a century-old schism on the proper wearing of monk's robes – whether one (atin) or both shoulders (ayon) should be covered. The Cūḷagandhī faction, led by Atulayāsa and grounded in local traditions, supported the one-shoulder practice but was purged from the Sangha. The victorious Mahāgandhī faction, which became the Thudhamma majority, advocated the two-shoulder rule based on Pāli Vinaya texts and their commentaries.

Over time, the council expanded to twelve members, to oversee religious matters.

The monastic reforms unified the Sangha under centralised control, absorbing various monastic lineages into a single order regulated by the Thudhamma Council. Toward the end of the Konbaung dynasty, the council oversaw religious affairs in the kingdom, including the appointment of monastery abbots, Vinaya regulations, discipline of individual monks, and administration of monastic examinations.

By the reign of King Mindon in the late 1800s, a movement toward independence emerged among monks to evade the Thudhamma Council's authority. Splinters like the Shwegyin Nikaya, Mahādvāra Nikāya, and Hngettwin Nikaya all emerged during the reign of King Mindon.

Since 1980, the Thudhamma Gaing has also included among their ranks the strict and unorthodox Tai Zawti subsect due to government merger demands.

== Thathanabaing and Gaṇādhipati ==
Since the breakaway of Shwegyin Sect (which appointed its own Shwegyin Thathanabaing), the Thathanabaing of Burma had power only on the Thudhamma Sect. Since the death of Taunggwin Sayadaw, no new Thathanabaing of Burma has been appointed again while other sects has continued to appoint their own Thathanabaings.

In the official lists of Gaṇādhipati (Sect leader) Sayadaws, the incumbent Chairman of the State Saṃgha Mahā Nāyaka Committee is listed as the Gaṇādhipati of Thudhamma Gaing together with the Thathanabaings of other sects. Thanlyin Mingyaung Sayadaw is the incumbent Chairman of SSMNC.

== See also ==
- Buddhist sects in Myanmar
- Shwegyin Nikaya
- Hngettwin Nikaya
- Mahādvāra Nikāya
- Mūladvāra Nikāya
- Anaukchaung Dvāra Gaing
- Kudo Gaing
- Nikaya
- Buddhism in Burma
