= Hngettwin Gaing =

Buddhist monastic order in Myanmar

Catubhummika Mahāsatipaṭṭhāna Hngettwin Sect
- စတုဘုမ္မိကမဟာသတိပဋ္ဌာန်ငှက်တွင်းဂိုဏ်း
- Abbreviation: ငှက်တွင်းဂိုဏ်း (Hngettwin Sect)
- Formation: 1888
- Type: Buddhist monastic order
- Headquarters: Myanmar
- Members: 1,445 (2016)
- Leader: H.H. Maymyo Sayadaw Baddhanta Vijaya, 10th Gaṇādhipati

Catubhummika Hngettwin Gaing (Burmese: စတုဘုမ္မိကငှက်တွင်းဂိုဏ်း, IPA: [sətùbòʊɴmìkà ŋ̊ɛʔtwɪ̀ɰ̃ gáɪɴ]), officially Catubhummika Mahāsatipaṭṭhāna Hngettwin Gaing (Burmese: စတုဘုမ္မိက မဟာသတိပဋ္ဌာန် ငှက်တွင်းဂိုဏ်း) is the name of a monastic order of monks in Burma, primarily in Mandalay. Founded in the mid-19th century by the abbot of the Hngettwin Monastery, it is one of 9 legally sanctioned monastic orders (gaṇa) in the country, under the 1990 Law Concerning Sangha Organizations. Hngettwin Gaing is a very orthodox order, with a minimalist and austere approach to Buddhist rituals found in Burma, not recognising any rituals inconsistent with Buddhist doctrine, including nat spirit worship. For instance, members of this order do not worship or venerate the image of Buddha, but rather his memory and teachings.

== Statistics ==
Ordained Buddhist monks by monastic order in Myanmar (2016).
1. Thudhamma 467,025 (87.3%)
2. Shwegyin 50,692 (9.47%)
3. Mahādvāra 6,066 (1.13%)
4. Mūladvāra 3,872 (0.72%)
5. Veḷuvan 3,732 (0.70%)
6. Hngettwin 1,445 (0.27%)
7. Kudo 927 (0.17%)
8. Mahāyin 823 (0.15%)
9. Anaukchaung 645 (0.12%)

According to 2016 statistics published by the State Sangha Maha Nayaka Committee, 1,445 monks belonged to this monastic order, representing 0.27% of all monks in the country, making it the fourth smallest legally-sanctioned monastic order. With respect to geographic representation, the plurality of Hngettwin monks are based in Yangon Region (31.90%), followed by Mandalay Region (24.57%), Ayeyarwady Region (17.92%). In 2016, the order had 173 monasteries, representing 0.3% of the country's monasteries.

== First-head of Sect ==
The following are the Sayadaws who have served as the Pathama Gaṇādhipati of the Catubhummika Mahāsatipaṭṭhān Hngettwin Sect.

1. Hngettwin Sayadaw Baddhanta Paṇḍava
2. Kungyangon Sayadaw Baddhanta Jotābhidhaja
3. Daungdaga Sayadaw Baddhanta Ñāṇadhaja
4. Kyungalay Sayadaw Baddhanta Candimā
5. Zidaw Sayadaw Baddhanta Āsabha
6. Hinthada Sayadaw Baddhanta Kosalla
7. Shwebo Sayadaw Baddhanta Sotālaṅkāra
8. Bogyoke Sayadaw Baddhanta Indakājiva
9. Thandwe Sayadaw Baddhanta Sundara
10. Maymyo Sayadaw Baddhanta Vijaya

== See also ==
- Thudhamma Gaing
- Shwegyin Nikaya
- Mahādvāra Nikāya
- Mūladvāra Nikāya
- Buddhist sects in Myanmar
- Buddhism in Myanmar
