= Anaukchaung Dvāra Gaing =

Buddhist monastic order in Myanmar

Anaukchaung Dvāra Sect
- အနောက်ချောင်းဒွါရဂိုဏ်း
- Abbreviation: အနောက်ချောင်းဂိုဏ်း (Anaukchaung Sect)
- Type: Buddhist monastic order
- Headquarters: Myanmar
- Members: 645 (2016)

Anaukchaung Dvāra Gaing (Burmese: အနောက်ချောင်းဒွါရဂိုဏ်း), also known as Anaukchaung Gaing (Burmese: အနောက်ချောင်းဂိုဏ်း) is one of the legally recognized monastic orders of Buddhism in Myanmar.

== Statistics ==
Ordained Buddhist monks by monastic order in Myanmar (2016).
1. Thudhamma 467,025 (87.3%)
2. Shwegyin 50,692 (9.47%)
3. Mahādvāra 6,066 (1.13%)
4. Mūladvāra 3,872 (0.72%)
5. Veḷuvan 3,732 (0.70%)
6. Hngettwin 1,445 (0.27%)
7. Kudo 927 (0.17%)
8. Mahāyin 823 (0.15%)
9. Anaukchaung 645 (0.12%)

According to 2016 statistics published by the State Samgha Maha Nayaka Committee, 645 monks belonged to this monastic order, representing 0.12% of all monks in the country.

== Origins ==
=== Dvāra Gaing ===
In 1214 of the Burmese Era (around 1852 CE), during British rule in the Ayeyarwady Region, Sayadaw Ashin Ukkamsa Vimala from the town of Okpho (now Ingapu township) had a dispute with the Sayadaws of the Sudhammā order (Thudhamma Gaing) who were under British jurisdiction.

This dispute was triggered by the issue of ordination (upasampadā) in a water sīmā (ye sim). Furthermore, Okpho Sayadaw ruled that when paying homage to The Buddha, one should not do so by reciting kāyakamma, vacīkamma, and manokamma (bodily action/karma, verbal action, mental action). According to him, the correct way was to pay homage with the concept of dvāra (door), by reciting kāyadvāra, vacīdvāra, and manodvāra (bodily door, verbal door, mental door). (Note: Currently, this method of paying homage [using dvāra] is no longer found. Almost the entire country pays homage only with kāyakamma, vacīkamma, manokamma.) He also argued that the Sangha could self-regulate without a Dhammarāja if the monks strictly followed the Vinaya (monastic discipline), emphasizing moral intention and challenging royal authority in ordinations.

Kyìthè Layhtat Sayadaw (of the Thudhamma order), author of the Jinattha-pakāsanī, refuted this view on homage, arguing that homage with the concept of kamma (action), rather than dvāra (door), was the correct one. Therefore, in Lower Myanmar, the order formed by Okpho Sayadaw was called the Dvāra Gaing ("Door Order"), while the Thudhamma order was called the Kamma Gaing ("Karma Order"). Later on, however, the name Kamma Gaing fell out of use, and it was again referred to as the Thudhamma Gaing.

The Dvāra Sect later split further into 3 Dvāra Sects, namely:

- Anaukchaung Dvāra Gaing (Western Stream Dvāra Sect)
- Mahādvāra Gaing (Great Dvāra Sect)
- Mūladvāra Gaing (Original/Root Dvāra Sect)

=== Anaukchaung Dvāra sect ===
During the tenure of Okpho Sayadaw as the Dvāra sect leader, the abbot of the Nga Thaing Chaung Waterfall Monastery was accused by monks from six other major Dvāra monasteries of the offence of the First Pārājika (sexual intercourse). The sect leader, Okpho Sayadaw, took the side of the accused abbot. As a result, the monks from those six monasteries established a separate sect. The Nga Wan River (nowadays, Pathein River) is locally called the Anaukchaung ("West Creek"). Based on this, the Dvara sect in the areas around Ye Kyi and Nga Thaing Chaung came to be known as the Anaukchaung Dvāra sect.
