= Thanlyin Mingyaung Sayadaw =

Sangharaja of Myanmar

His Holiness Bhaddanta Candimābhivaṃsa Sayadaw Phyagyi
- စန္ဒိမာဘိဝံသ
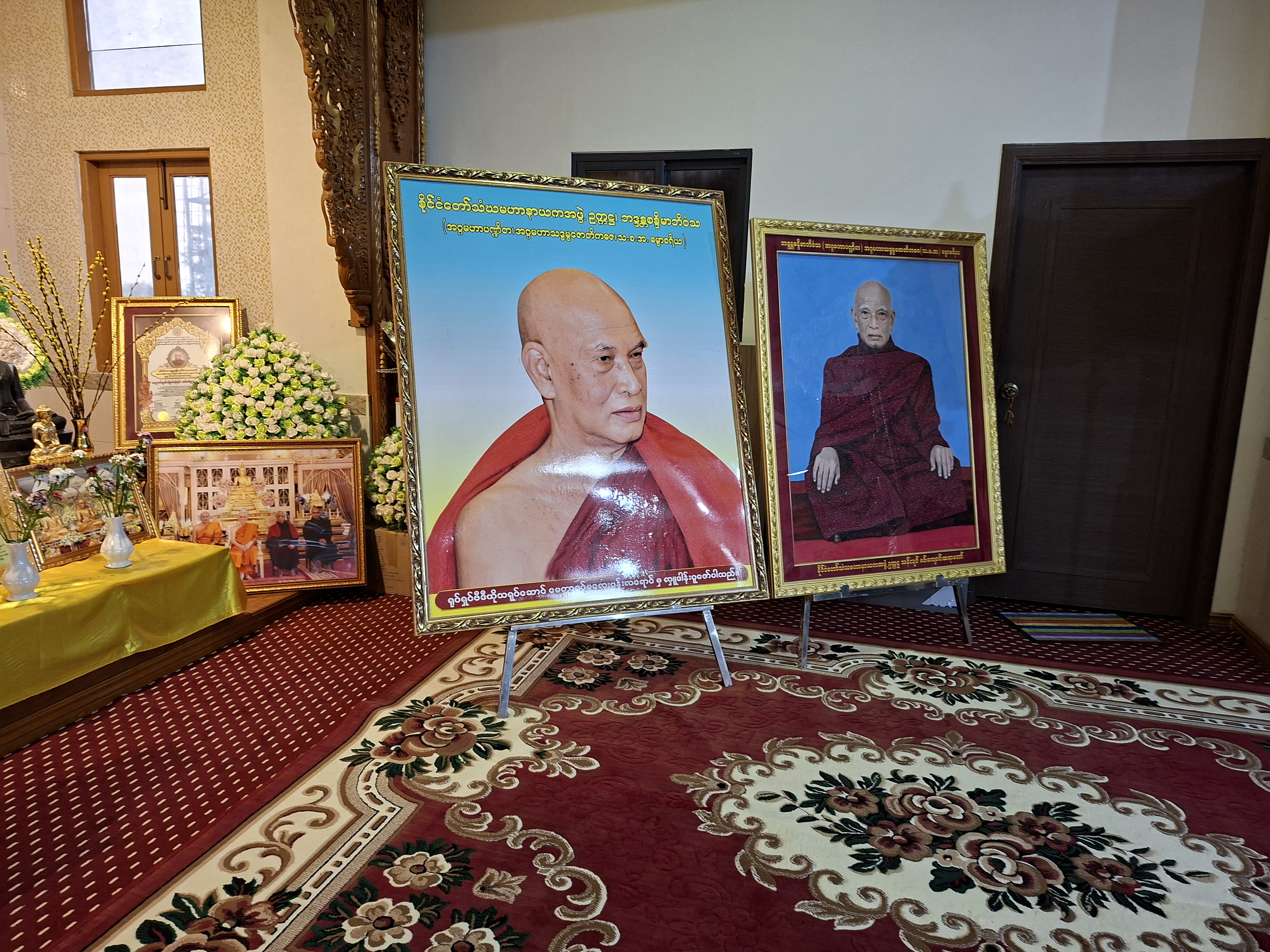
- Bhaddanta Candimābhivaṃsa's portrait in Thanlyin Mingyaung Monastery, Yangon
- Title: Agga Mahā Paṇḍita

Religious life
- Religion: Buddhism
- Temple: Thanlyin Mingyaung Pariyatti Monastery
- School: Theravada
- Dharma names: Candimā
- Consecration: 9 March 2023

Senior posting
- Period in office: Chairman of the State Samgha Maha Nayaka Committee
- Predecessor: Banmaw Sayadaw

Candimābhivaṃsa, commonly known by his position as Thanlyin Mingyaung Sayadaw, is the incumbent Chairman of the Ninth State Samgha Maha Nayaka Committee. Chief abbot of Mingyaung Pariyatti Monastery in Thanlyin, Sayadaw assumed the position on 9 March 2024. As the incumbent Chairman of SSMNC, he is also the head of Sudhammā Sect.

== Life ==
Sayadaw was born on 4 February 1947 in Bawgalut Village, Kyauktan Township in Yangon. Born to U Htwe and Daw Kyin, he is the only son and was named Soe Thein. At age 12, he became novice under Bawgalut Sayadaw and was named Candimā. Moved to Mingyaung Monastery in Thanlyin, he passed three levels of Pathamabyan examinations between 1962 and 1966. The whole Burma's first in Pathamagyi examination, he was titled Pathamagyaw.

Candimā was ordained as a monk in Mingyaung Monastery on 27 May 1964. He completed the series of Dhammācariya examinations by 1977 and received the titles of Sāsanadhaja Dhammācariya, Cetīyangana Pariyatti Dhammācariya Ganavācaka, and Pariyattisāsanahita Dhammācariya. Since July 1977, he has served a Pariyatti master in Mingyaung Monastery.

== Honours ==
- Agga Mahā Panḍita
- Agga Mahā Sadhammajotikadhaja
