= Taunggwin Sayadaw =

Buddhist monk and last Thathanabaing of Burma

- တောင်ခွင်ဆရာတော်
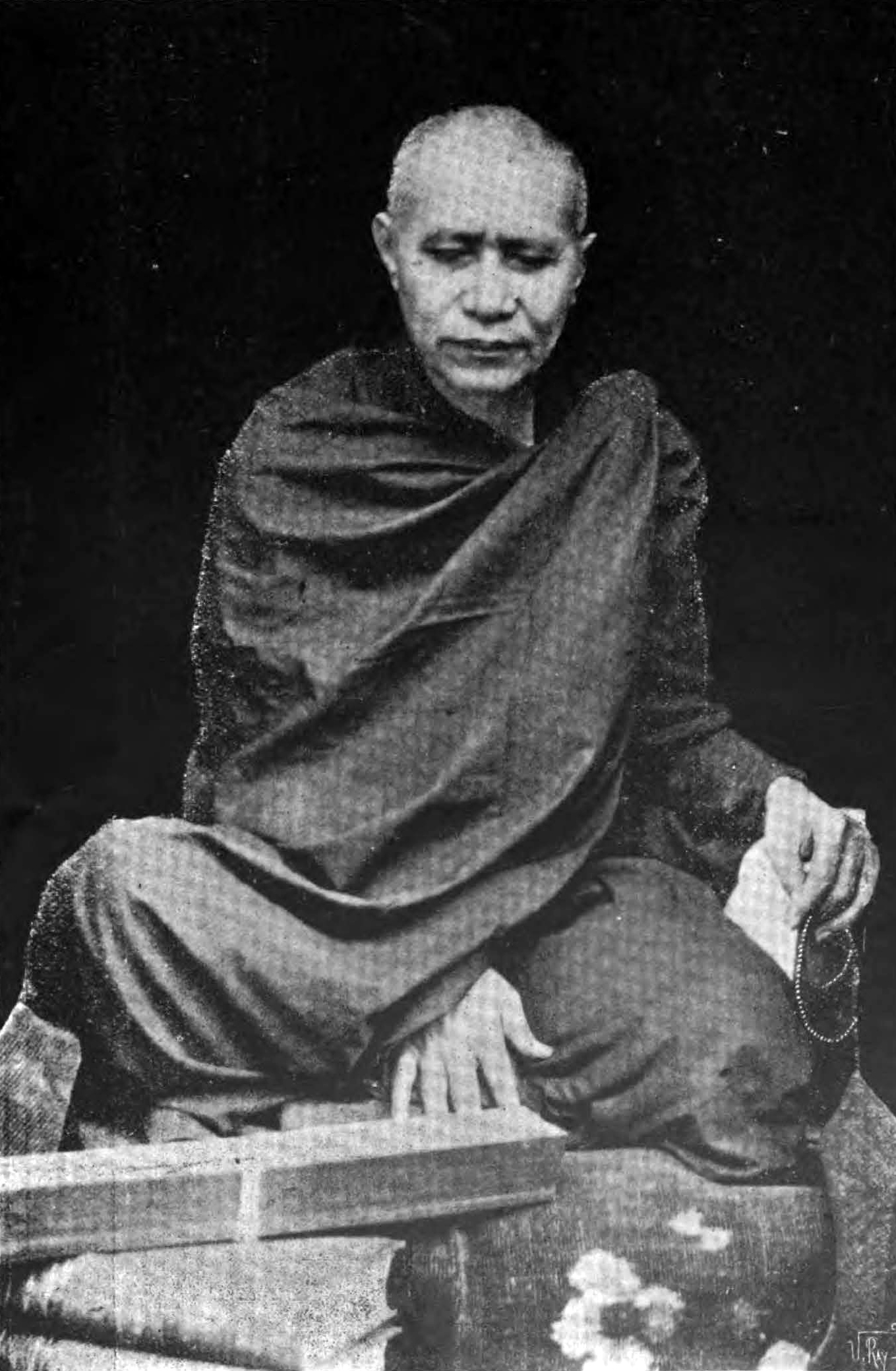
- Title: Thathanabaing

Personal life
- Born: Maung Hlut (မောင်လွှတ်); 13 November 1844 Amarapura, Konbaung Dynasty
- Died: 1938 (aged 93–94)
- Occupation: Buddhist monk

Religious life
- Religion: Buddhism
- School: Theravada
- Dharma names: Visuddha (ဝိသုဒ္ဓ)

The Taunggwin Sayadaw U Visuddha Silacaraha (တောင်ခွင်ဆရာတော် ဦးဝိသုဒ္ဓ သီလာစာရဟာ) was the last Buddhist monk to hold the office as Thathanabaing of Burma. The office was abolished after his death in 1938 and no successor was ever appointed.

Visuddha was born Maung Hlut (မောင်လွှတ်) on 13 November 1844 in Amarapura to a prominent Burmese family. His father, U Po, was a Burmese official and son of a Sitke (Deputy Commander-in-Chief), while his mother Me Shwe Wa, was the daughter of a high-ranking minister, the Kyauksauk Mingyi, Maha Thihathu. Visuddha's father died when he was three years of age and at the age of 9, he entered monastic life as a pupil, under the tutelage of U Adicca.

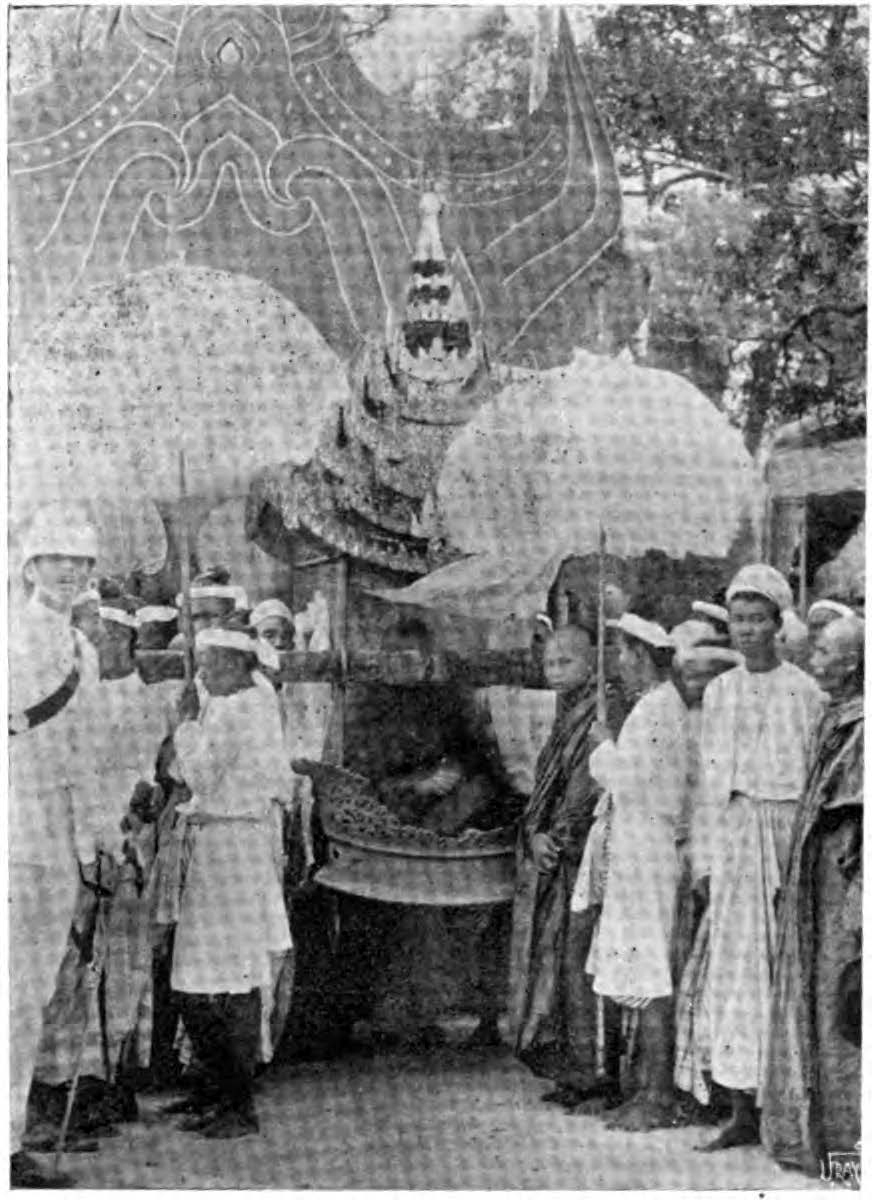
Procession of the Taunggwin Sayadaw at his installation as Thathanabaing of Upper Burma in 1903.

He was made a samanera (novice monk) at the age of 14, under U Maida, a thera. At the age of 19, Visuddha was fully ordained as a bhikkhu. At the age of 25, he relocated to Mandalay and placed himself under the mentorship of the Maungdaung Sayadaw, a reputed scholar on the Vinaya. In 1873, King Mindon Min granted Visuddha the title of sayadaw ('royal teacher'). He then took independent charge of a monastery whose chief donor was the Chief Queen. In 1877, at the invitation of the Taunggwin Mingyi, the Sayadaw relocated and took charge of a group of monasteries known as the Taunggwin Kyaukdaik.

When the Taungdaw Sayadaw held office as Thathanabaing, the Taunggwin Sayadaw was appointed as his Deputy, to decide differences between Buddhist monks and to enforce compliance with the Vinaya. The Daungdaw Sayadaw was appointed by King Thibaw Min, the last king of the Konbaung Dynasty.

In 1901, an assembly of 2,000 Buddhist monks elected the Moda Sayadaw as the Thathanabaing, a post that had been vacant since 1895, with the death of the Taungdaw Sayadaw. However, the Moda Sayadaw died soon afterward. On 24 October 1903, the Taunggwin Sayadaw was announced by the Burma Gazette as the Thathanabaing, having jurisdiction over only Upper Burma. He was formally installed to his office on 13 November 1903, at a darbar held at the Thudhamma Zayat in Mandalay.
