= Sitagu Sayadaw =

Myanmar Buddhist monk (born 1937)

- သီတဂူဆရာတော်
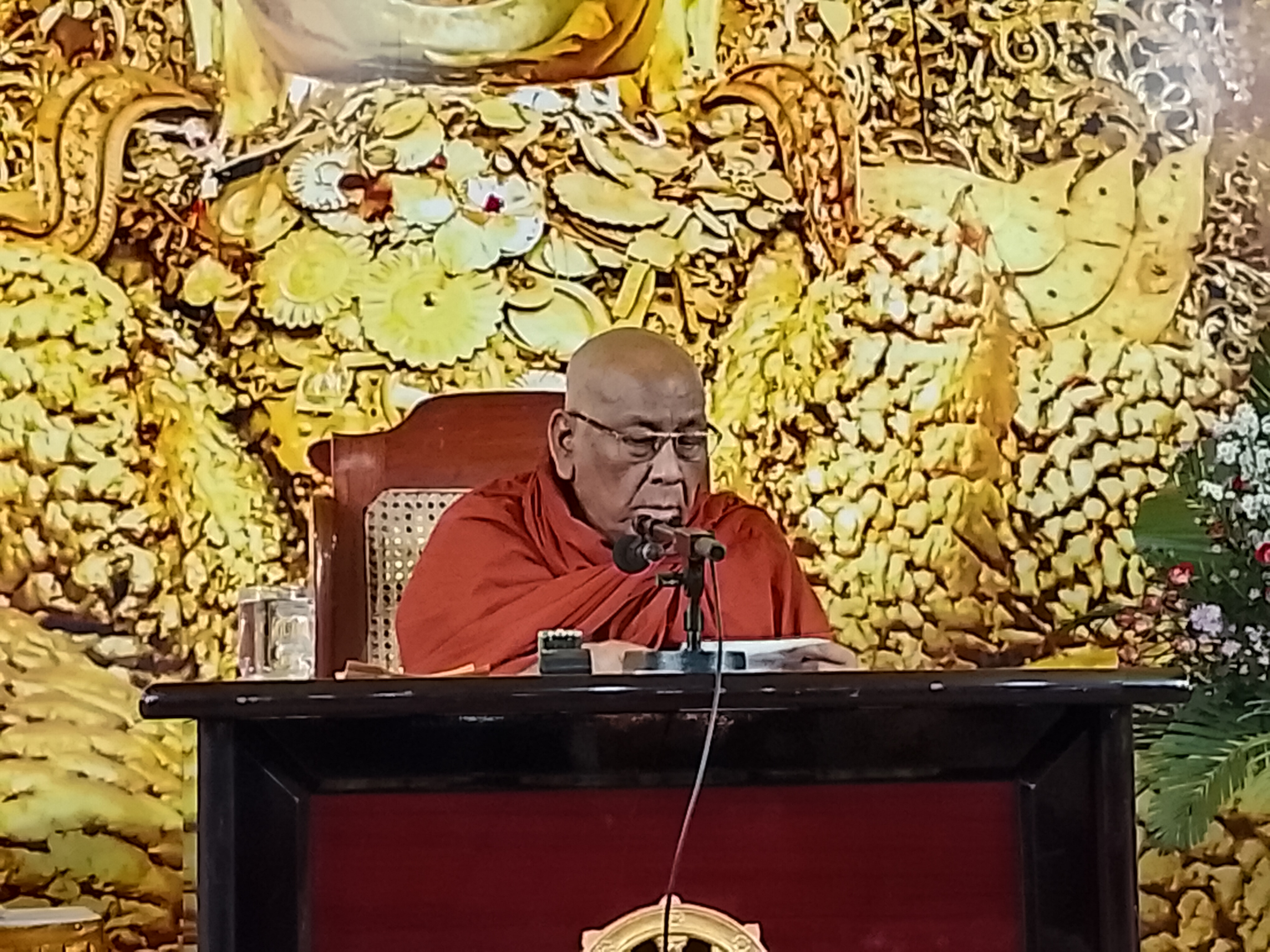
- Sitagu Sayadaw at Maha Myat Muni Pagoda, Mandalay, 2026
- Title: Sangha Rājā of Shwekyin Nikāya

Personal life
- Born: 23 February 1937 (age 89) Thegon Township, Bago Division, Myanmar
- Education: Khin-ma-gan Pali University, Mandalay (M.A.); Sangha University, Yangon
- Other names: Venerable Dr. Ashin Nyanissara; U Nyanissara; Thegon Sayadaw; Thabeik Aine Sayadaw
- Occupation: Buddhist monk

Religious life
- Religion: Buddhism
- School: Theravada
- Lineage: Shwekyin Nikāya
- Dharma names: Ñāṇissara

Senior posting
- Teacher: Anicakhan Sayadaw Ashin Pandita
- Based in: Sagaing Hills, Myanmar
- Website: thesitagu.org

Ashin Nyanissara (Burmese: ဉာဏိဿရ; IAST: Ñāṇissara) best known as Sitagu Sayadaw (သီတဂူဆရာတော်), is a Burmese meditation teacher and prolific Buddhist scholar. He is also the founder of Sitagu International Buddhist Academy.

His work as a teacher began in 1977 and encompasses religious, educational, medical and infrastructural activities. He travels worldwide to promote his humanitarian efforts and for interfaith dialogue. In 2012, he became the Shwegyin Nikaya's Upaukkaṭṭha (ဥပဥက္ကဋ္ဌ; lit. 'first and foremost').

== Social and charity work ==
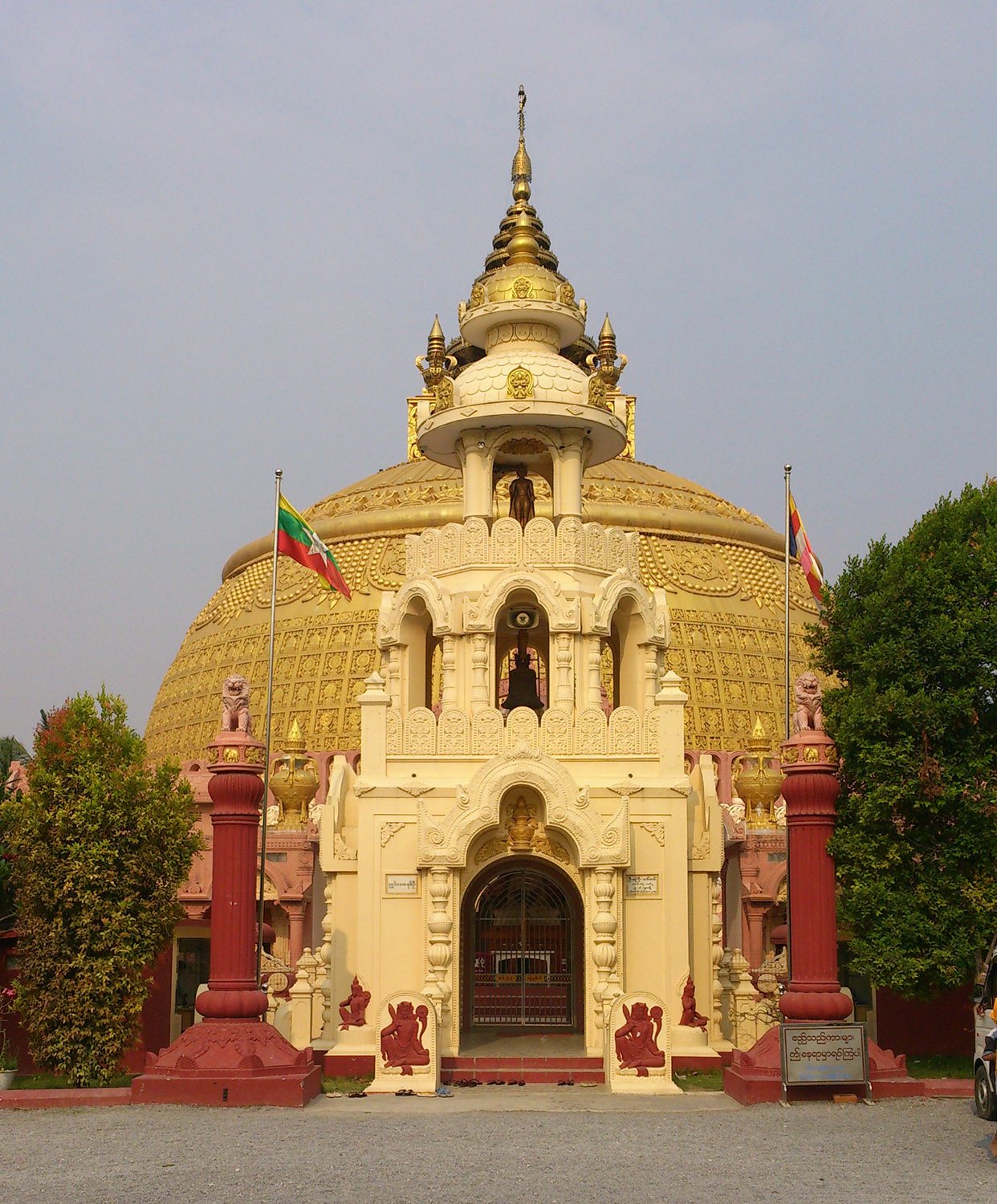
Sitagu Buddhist Academy

Sitagu Sayadaw is known for his charismatic leadership and practices of socially-engaged Buddhism. His organization has funded many social projects in Burma, including water pumps, construction of hospitals such as the Sitagu Ayudana Hospital in Sagaing in 1985, and the Sitagu Buddhist Academy in 1998.

Sitagu Sayadaw was lauded for his missionary and charity works, especially in the aftermath of Cyclone Nargis in 2008, which killed upwards of 100,000 in the country's delta regions.

He is also interested in interfaith dialogue and currently sits on the Board of World Religious Leaders for the Elijah Interfaith Institute.

== Controversy ==
The sayadaw has associated in recent years with the Buddhist nationalist group Patriotic Association of Myanmar. In May 2017, the sayadaw preached a sermon in Kayin State to Myanmar Army officers likely to be involved with the suppression in Arakan state. In the sermon, he argues that bad karma obtained from killing of those who do not follow the five precepts is much less than of those who do. On May 28, 2019, after having delivered a sermon, he singled Ashin Wirathu, then in hiding, out from among the saṅgha, asking in rhetoric, "Where is Wirathu? He is my comrade."

In February 2021, the sayadaw had appeared not to affix his signature to a statement released by the Sitagu International Buddhist Academy in response to the then-days-old military coup and the ensuing protests against it. The letter was criticized as having presented a false balance between the two opposing sides. In March 2021, however, the sayadaw, along with the other leading monks of the Shwekyin Nikāya, added his signature to a letter that urged Min Aung Hlaing to immediately cease the assaults on unarmed civilians protesting the takeover by the military and to refrain from engaging in theft and property destruction. The letter reminded the general to be a good Buddhist. The March letter gained notoriety for the discrepancies between its signed original draft and its final version, the latter which appears to have legitimized Min Aung Hlaing's rule through a veiled reference to him as king. The Burmese word for 'king', min (Burmese: မင်း, MLCTS: mang:), coincides with the first syllable of the general's name, even in the Burmese script.

The sayadaw was criticized for having attended a religious-donation event on March 26, 2021, upon invitation from the State Administration Council (SAC), during which a ceremony was held in relation to a religious-construction project involving what is reported to become the largest marble Buddha statue in existence. The criticism also brought the sayadaw's continued personal association with Min Aung Hlaing back to the fore.

== Honorific titles ==
The State Peace and Development Council bestowed two honorific titles upon him:

- In 1993 Sitagu Sayadaw was awarded the title Mahādhammakatika Bahujanahitadhara which means "great Dhamma preacher".
- In 1995 he received the title Aggamahāsaddhammajotikadhaja means "great Dhamma preacher and benefactor of many".

== Honorary doctorates ==
Honorary doctorates received from Myanmar and International Universities:

1. In February 2003, the University of Yangon, Myanmar honored the Venerable with a Doctor of Letters (D.Litt.).
2. In April 2005, he was conferred an honorary degree of Doctor of Philosophy (Ph.D.) from Mahachulalongkorajavidyalaya University in Bangkok, Thailand.
3. In May 2008, he received an honorary degree of Doctor of Philosophy (Ph.D.) from Mahamakut Buddhist University, Thailand.
4. In October 2008, he received an honorary degree of Doctor of Philosophy (Ph.D.) from Nava Nalanda University, India.
5. In February 2015, he received an honorary degree of Doctor of Philosophy (Ph.D.) from Pannasastra University, Cambodia.
