= Buddhist sects in Myanmar =

Buddhist sects and monastic orders in Myanmar

Buddhist sects in Myanmar are the monastic orders of Buddhism that are practised in the country.

Monastic orders of Theravāda Buddhism in Myanmar are officially called "sects", but they differ mainly in ordination lineage, monastic administration, and interpretations of Vinaya discipline rather than major doctrinal differences. All of them are recognized as belonging to the Theravāda tradition and share the authority of the Pāḷi Canon. The nine recognized "Theravada Sangha sects" (monastic orders) constitute the "one and only Sangha organization" as explicitly stipulated in the Law Relating to Sangha Organization, 1990, but the law does not mention Mahāyāna Buddhism. There have also been attempts to create new forms of Buddhism, but such sects are deemed heretical and subsequently banned.

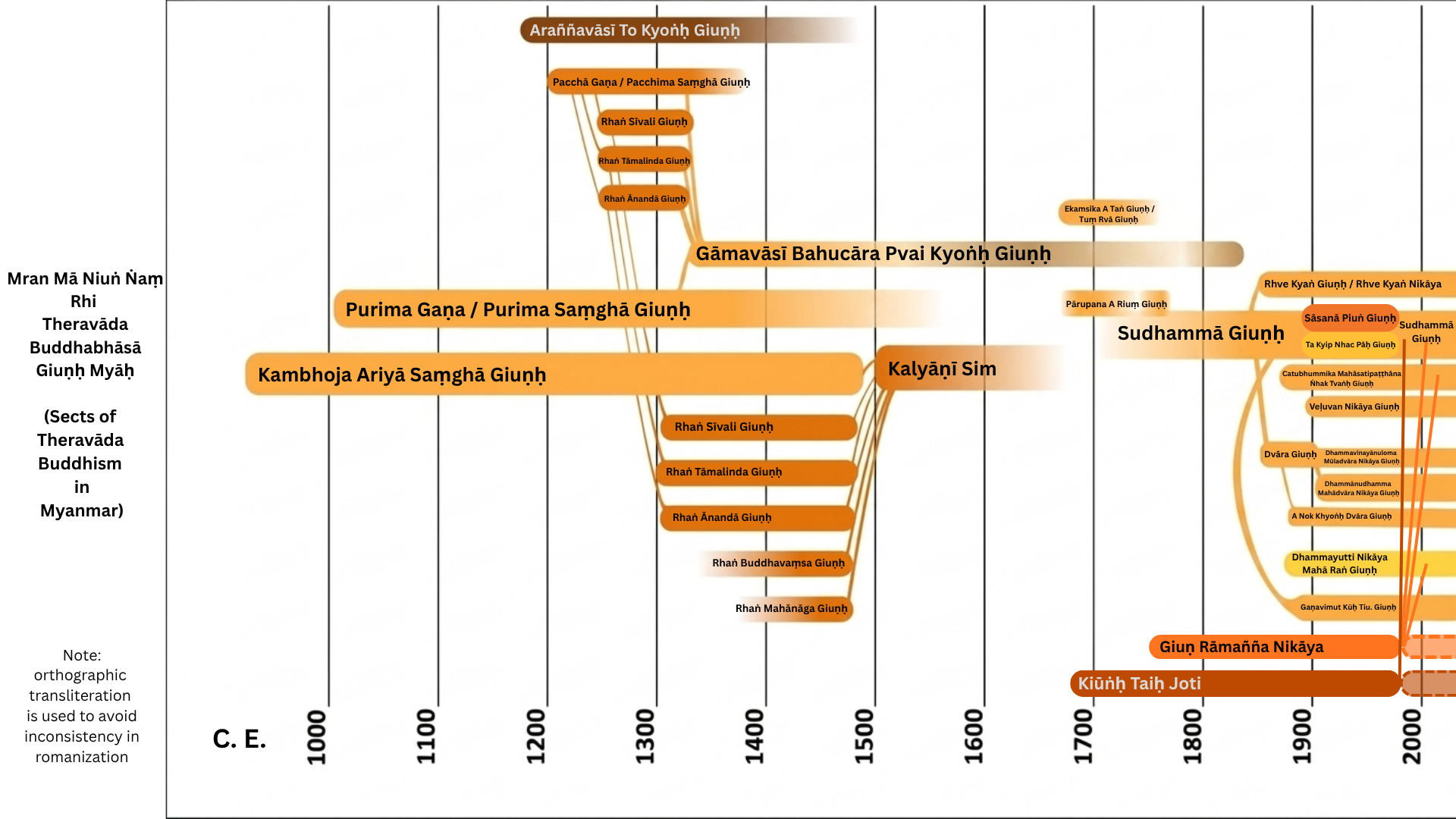
Timeline of monastic sects of Theravada Buddhism in Myanmar (names are orthographically transliterated; non-Theravada sects are not included here)

Before the arrival of Theravāda Buddhism, Ari Buddhism was widespread in the Pagan Kingdom. The first schism into four sects occurred 150 years after the adoption of Theravāda Buddhism in Pagan and was later brought to an end by a purification effort led by a Hanthawady king according to the Kalyāṇi Sima stone inscriptions. Throughout the Ava period and the early Konbaung period, new schisms emerged between town-dwelling sects and forest-dwelling sects and between the one-shoulder covering sect and the both-shoulder covering sect. The defeat of the one-shoulder covering sect resulted in a unified order, but new sects emerged again in the late Konbaung period and throughout British rule. Currently, only nine sects are sanctioned by law, and creating new sects is prohibited and punishable by imprisonment.

== The word "Gaing", "Gaṇa" or "Sect" ==
Derived from the Pali word "Gaṇa", the Burmese word "ဂိုဏ်း" (ALA-LC: Guiṇʻʺ), known as "Gaing", can mean group, sect, or gang, and can also refer to the occult and cults. In the context of the Saṃgha, "Gaing" is translated into English as "sect". The word "Gana" is sometimes used in state-owned English-language news outlets.

The sects that emerged from the first schism during the Pagan period were recorded as using the Pali term "Gaṇa" in their names.

== Historical schisms ==
=== Native vs Sri Lankan lineages ===
- Purimagaṇa / Purima Saṃghā Sect
  - lineage of Shin Arahan, lineage from Sudhuim
- Pacchāgaṇa / Pacchima Saṃghā Sect
  lineage of disciples of Chapada who studied as novices and were ordained as full monks in Sri Lanka. Chapada Thera caused a schism in Burma upon his return, and his friends from Sri Lanka who came with him caused a further schism later:
  - lineage of disciples of Sīvali (Note: not to be confused with Indian Sīvali)
  - lineage of disciples of Tāmalinda
  - lineage of disciples of Ānanda (Note: not to be confused with Indian Ānanda)

=== Town-dwelling vs Forest-dwelling ===
- Gāmavāsī Bahucāra Festive Monastery Sect
- Araññavāsī Forest Monastery Sect

=== Hat-wearing and Shoulder-covering controversy ===
- Pārupana Sect / Ayon Sect / Ayondaw Sect
- Ekamsika Sect / Atin Sect / Ton Village Sect
- Gāmavāsī Hat-wearing Sect

== The nine sects of the Sangha ==
Nine Sangha sects (monastic orders) were registered with the Department of Religious Affairs by 1 February 1980. The Law Relating to Sangha Organization, enacted by the SLORC junta in 1990, explicitly recognizes only these nine sects and prohibits the formation of new sects. However, the law allows the existing sects to merge. The official list of the Nine Major Sects of Saṃghā (သံဃာဂိုဏ်းကြီးကိုးဂိုဏ်း) is as follows:

1. သုဓမ္မာဂိုဏ်း Sudhammā Sect
2. ရွှေကျင်ဂိုဏ်း Shwegyin Sect
3. ဓမ္မာနုဓမ္မ မဟာဒွါရနိကာယဂိုဏ်း Dhammānudhamma Mahādvāra Nikāya Sect
4. ဓမ္မဝိနယာနုလောမ မူလဒွါရနိကာယဂိုဏ်း Dhammavinayānuloma Mūladvāra Nikāya Sect
5. အနောက်ချောင်းဒွါရဂိုဏ်း Anaukchaung Dvāra Sect
6. ဝေဠုဝန် နိကာယဂိုဏ်း Veḷuvanna Nikāya Sect
7. စတုဘုမ္မိက မဟာသတိပဋ္ဌာန် ငှက်တွင်းဂိုဏ်း Catubhummika Mahāsatipaṭṭhāna Hngettwin Sect
8. ဂဏဝိမုတ် ကူးတို့ဂိုဏ်း Gaṇavimut Kudo Sect
9. ဓမ္မယုတ္တိနိကာယ မဟာရင်ဂိုဏ်း Dhammayutti Nikāya Mahāyin Sect

=== Sudhammā Sect ===
Originally, Sudhammā was not the name of a sect. According to the tradition that Thagyamin (Sakka) judged crimes and legal cases at the Sudhammā resthouse in Tāvatiṃsā heaven, Sudhammā is the meeting place where senior monks (Sayadaws) discuss and judge matters relating to Sāsanā, the Buddhist religion. Before the breakaway of other sects, all of the Sangha in Myanmar were under the administration of the Suddhamā Council. Since the breakaway of the Shwegyin Sect, monks who are not members of the new sects are automatically regarded as belonging to the Sudhammā Sect.

==== Thathanabaing Sect vs Twelve Monks Sect ====
In 1257 M.E. (1894 C.E.), the dispute between the Sudhammā Council and the Thathanabaing election gave rise to a split into two sects: the "Thathanabaing Sect", whose members followed the Thathanabaing elected by laymen and monks outside the Sudhammā Council, and the "Twelve Monks Sect", whose members followed the twelve then-incumbent members of the Sudhammā Council.

=== Shwegyin Sect ===
In the year 1214 M.E. (1852-1853 C.E.), the Sudhammā Council summoned the Shwegyin Sayadaw U Jāgara before it. As he did not come, the Sudhammā Council prepared to bring him by force. Some Sudhammā Sayadaws who were friends of Shwegyin Sayadaw advised him to flee to Lower Burma (then under British rule). When King Mindon heard the news, he issued the royal order of Ganavimut, prohibiting the Sudhammā Council from summoning the Shwegyin Sayadaw and stating that the council no longer had the right to summon him and that he could live independently. Since then, the lineage of Shwegyin Sayadaw has been called the Shwegyin Sect.

=== The three Dvāra sects ===
On a Uposatha day in 1214 M.E. (1852-1853 C.E.), Okpho Sayadaw U Uggaṃsa went to a monastery of local gaing-dauk (sect's assistant head) sayadaws. There, he saw them performing rites at an udakukkhepa sīmā connected by a bridge to a gāmakhetta. He refused to join them in performing the rites, saying that they had failed because the udakukkhepa sīmā was connected with the gāmakhetta. The gaing-dauk sayadaws argued against him. A Vinaya dispute subsequently arose, resulting in the formation of a new sect, but the sect did not receive the name Dvarā at that time. The Okpho Sayadaw instructed his followers to replace the words kāyakamma, vacīkamma, manokamma in the Okāsa prayer with the words kāyadvāra, vacīdvāra, manodvāra. In 1217 M.E., a dispute broke out among the Uposatha observers over whether the recitation with three dvāra or the one with three kamma was correct. When they asked the Okpho Sayadaw, he judged that the recitation with dvāra was the only correct way, citing the Aṅguttara Nikāya of the Pāli canon. Those who disagreed asked the Kyìthè Layhtat Sayadaw (author of the Jinattha-pakāsanī), who judged that they should recite with kamma, citing the verse "natvāti kāyakamma vacīkamma manokamma saṅkhātehi tīhikammehi namassitvā". Thus, the sect of Okpho Sayadaw was called "Dvāravādī Sect", while those who disagreed with him (i.e., Sudhammā followers) were called "Kammavādī Sect". The Okpho Sayadaw was proficient in astrology. He said that the full moon days and new moon days in the Burmese calendar occurred one day earlier than the actual dates. He and his follower monks performed rites on the first waning days and the first waxing days instead of on full moon days and new moon days until he died.

==== Anaukchaung Dvāra Sect ====
Monks from six monasteries of the Dvāra Sect near the Ngawun River, locally known as Anaukchaung (Western Stream), accused the Ngathaingchaung Yetagun Monastery Sayadaw of committing the first Pārajika offense with a woman. Because the Dvāra Sect leader Okpho Sayadaw sided with the accused monk, the monks from those six monasteries broke away and founded a separate sect. The Anaukchaung Dvāra Sect is led by six sayadaws.

==== Dhammānudhamma Mahādvāra Nikāya Sect ====
In the 13 years after Okpho Sayadaw's death, no one had been elected as the new Mahānāyaka of Dvāra sāsanā. In 1280 M.E. (1918-1919 C.E.), the Dvāra Sect held a Sangha meeting that elected the Yangon Monastery Sayadaw from Hinthada as the second Mahānāyaka of Dvāra Sāsanā and gave the title "Dhammānudhamma Mahādvāra Nikāya" to the sect. The majority of Dvāra monks reverted to performing rites on full moon days and new moon days in the Burmese calendar, citing a teaching of the Buddha according to which these days were to be determined by the king or the government (rāja padhāna).

==== Dhammavinayānuloma Mūladvāra Nikāya Sect ====
Ingapu Sayadaw and his followers had personal and doctrinal disputes with Dvāra Sayadaws from Hinthada. When the Hinthada monks held a Sangha meeting and took the name "Mahādvāra Nikaya", the Ingapu Sayadaw named his group "Mūladvāra" without holding a Sangha meeting. The Mūladvāra Nikāya retains the practice of performing rites on the first waning days and the first waxing days, as taught by the Okpho Sayadaw. The sect later took the title "Dhammavinayānuloma Mūladvāra Nikāya," meaning "the original Dvāra sect which practices according to Dhamma and Vinaya."

== Annual monk population data ==
According to the rules and regulations of the Sangha Organization of Myanmar, every monastery belonging to one of the nine recognized monastic sects is required to submit annually the number of monks and novices residing there.

Sect	1377 M.E. (2016 C.E.) Number of monks	1381 M.E. (2019 C.E.) Number of monks	1382 M.E. (2020 C.E.) Number of monks
Sudhammā	467025	453415	465189
Shwegyin	50692	49729	46780
Mahādvāra	6066	5838	6147
Mūladvāra	3872	4341	4103
Anaukchaung	645	386	449
Veḷuvan	3732	3739	3758
Hngettwin	1445	1289	1356
Mahāyin	823	879	1049
Kudo	927	833	939
Total	535327	520449	529770

== Unrecognized sects within the recognized sects ==
Other unrecognized sects of the Sangha had to merge with the recognized sects because they had not registered by 2 February 1980 and had failed to send sect representatives to the meeting that year.

Some sects, such as the Tai Zawti Sect, have merged into the Sudhammā Sect but retain their characteristics.

The Rāmañña Nikāya is a Mon ethnic monastic order whose monks are currently de jure members of the Shwegyin, Mahāyin, and Sudhammā sects. Although it did not receive recognition in 1980, it has maintained the de facto structure of a nikāya monastic order since 1920. It has been requesting formal recognition from the government since the 2020s.

== Sects of Mahayana Buddhism ==
Mahāyāna Buddhism is also practised in modern Myanmar mostly by people of Chinese descent, but also by members of some minority ethnic groups.

== Banned sects ==
Some sects that are deemed to be against Theravāda Buddhism but unrelated to Mahāyāna Buddhism have been banned. The Sky Blue Sect (မိုးပြာဂိုဏ်း), known as Paccuppan Kammavāda Buddhism (ပစ္စုပ္ပန်ကမ္မဝါဒဗုဒ္ဓဘာသာ), is among the banned sects.

== See also ==
- Schools of Buddhism
