= State Samgha Maha Nayaka Committee =

Governing committee in Myanmar

State Saṃgha Mahā Nāyaka Committee
- နိုင်ငံတော်သံဃမဟာနာယကအဖွဲ့ (မဟန)
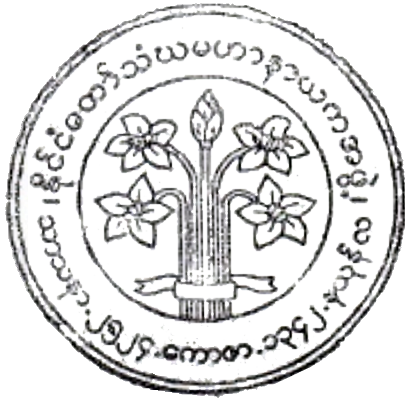

Council overview
- Formed: 24 May 1980; 46 years ago
- Preceding council: Thathanabaing of Burma
- Type: Committee
- Jurisdiction: Saṃgha of Myanmar
- Headquarters: Kaba Aye Hill, Yangon, Myanmar; 16.85798°N 96.15422°E
- Employees: 47 Members Monks
- Council executive: Bhaddanta Candimābhivaṃsa (Thanlyin Mingyaung Sayadaw), Chairperson; Bhaddanta Vasitthabhivaṃsa (Ma'soe Yein Sayadaw), Secretary
- Parent department: Ministry of Religious Affairs and Culture
- Website: www.mahana.org.mm

The State Saṃgha Mahā Nāyaka Committee (Burmese: နိုင်ငံတော်သံဃမဟာနာယကအဖွဲ့, ALA-LC: Nuiṅ‘ṅaṃto‘ Saṃgha Mahā Nāyaka Aphvai', abbreviated Mahana or မဟန in Burmese, SSMNC in English) is a government-appointed body of high-ranking Buddhist monks that oversees and regulates the Saṃgha (Buddhist clergy) in Burma (Myanmar).

== History ==
The Committee was formed after the First Congregation of All Orders for the Purification, Perpetuation and Propagation of Sasana, which sought to consolidate state control of the country's Samgha, was held in Rangoon (now Yangon) from 24 to 27 May 1980. The Congregation developed a hierarchy to regulate monks at the village tract/ward, state/division and national levels via committees and devised a central governing body of 33 members now called the State Saṃgha Maha Nāyaka Committee, which would be responsible for all Buddhist monks in the country. The Committee also developed regulations to force monks to register and receive separate identification cards.

== Membership ==
The Committee consists of 47 members, including a chairperson, six vice-chairpersons, one secretary general, six joint general secretaries and 33 other members. The State Samgha Maha Nayaka Committee is elected by the State Central Samgha Working Committee which, in turn, is elected by the Samghasammutti representatives from each gaing in the entire country and from each State and Region. The Ministry of Religious Affairs and the local authorities assist only for security; the government agencies do not interfere the election.

The chairman acts as the equivalent of the Thathanabaing of Burma from the pre-schism period. The head monks are divided into three groups, which each serve a term of four months. During their term, they reside on the premise of the Ministry of Religious Affairs and cooperate with it.

Until 1995, appointment terms lasted 5 years. Since 1995, the government has cut term lengths, with a quarter of seats changed every 3 years.

== State Saṃgha Mahā Nāyaka Committee, 9th (2025-present) ==
| No. | Name | Monastery | | Duty |
|---|---|---|---|---|
| 1. | Dr. Bhaddanta Candimābhivaṃsa | Mingyaung Pathamabyan Sathintaik, Thanlyin Town, Yangon Region | | Chairman |
| 2. | Bhaddanta Vāseṭṭhābhivaṃsa | Dhammasamiddhi Monastery, Masoyein Taikthit, Maha Aungmye Township, Mandalay Region | | Secretary |
First Subcommittee
| No. | Name | Monastery | Sect | Duty |
| 1. | Bhaddanta Kovida | Sāsanavepulla Kyaungtaik, Meiktila Town, Mandalay Region | Sudhammā Sect | Vice-chairman |
| 2. | Bhaddanta Jotipāla | Sīrimālā Kyaung, Kozaung Taik, Myingyan Town, Mandalay Region | Sudhammā Sect | Vice-chairman |
| 3. | Bhaddanta Kovida | Shwemañjū Kyaungtaik, Nyaungsaye Village, Shwetaung Township, Bago Region | Sudhammā Sect | Associate Secretary |
| 4. | Bhaddanta Inddācariya | Pariyatti Dhammikāyon Kyaung, Minbya Town, Mrauk-U District, Rakhine State | Sudhammā Sect | Associate Secretary |
| 5. | Bhaddanta Vāyāma | Shwe Kyaungtaik, Taungpyon Village, Tada-U Township, Mandalay Region | Sudhammā Sect | Member |
| 6. | Dr. Bhaddanta Sūriya | Ussāsīri Sathintaik, Bago Town, Bago Region | Sudhammā Sect | Member |
| 7. | Bhaddanta Sīha | Mahāvisutārāma (middle) Taik, Pakokku Town, Magway Region | Sudhammā Sect | Member |
| 8. | Bhaddanta Uttama | Jambū Aye A T Tat-U Kyaung, 12-Ward, Lashio City, Shan State (North) | Sudhammā Sect | Member |
| 9. | Bhaddanta Panḍicca | | Sudhammā Sect | Member |
| 10. | Bhaddanta Canda | | Sudhammā Sect | Member |
| 11. | Bhaddanta Virocana | | Sudhammā Sect | Member |
| 12. | Bhaddanta Kañcana | | Sudhammā Sect | Member |
| 13. | Bhaddanta Indāvudha | | (unknown) | Member |
| 14. | Bhaddanta Subhoga | | Sudhammā Sect | Member |
| 15. | Bhaddanta Nandapāla | | Sudhammā Sect | Member |
Second Subcommittee
| No. | Name | Monastery | Sect | Duty |
| 1. | Bhaddanta Candavaṃsālaṅkārābhivaṃsa | | Sudhammā Sect | Vice-chairman |
| 2. | Bhaddanta Candāvarābhivaṃsa | | Sudhammā Sect | Vice-chairman |
| 3. | Bhaddanta Jotissara | | Mahādvāra Sect | Associate Secretary |
| 4. | Bhaddanta Kañcanābhivaṃsa | | Shwegyin Sect | Associate Secretary |
| 5. | Bhaddanta Dhammānandābhivaṃsa | | Sudhammā Sect | Member |
| 6. | Bhaddanta Sumanābhivaṃsa | | Sudhammā Sect | Member |
| 7. | Bhaddanta Veḷuriya | | Shwegyin Sect | Member |
| 8. | Bhaddanta Kosalla | | Sudhammā Sect | Member |
| 9. | Bhaddanta Kesava | | Sudhammā Sect | Member |
| 10. | Bhaddanta Sopāka | | Sudhammā Sect | Member |
| 11. | Bhaddanta Jotipālālaṅkāra | | Shwegyin Sect | Member |
| 12. | Bhaddanta Kuṇḍala | | Sudhammā Sect | Member |
| 13. | Bhaddanta Javana | | Sudhammā Sect | Member |
| 14. | Bhaddanta Kalyāṇa | | Sudhammā Sect | Member |
| 15. | Bhaddanta | | Mūladvāra Sect | Member |
Third Subcommittee
| No. | Name | Monastery | Sect | Duty |
| 1. | Bhaddanta Kesarābhivaṃsa | | Sudhammā Sect | Vice-chairman |
| 2. | Bhaddanta Sucitta | | Sudhammā Sect | Vice-chairman |
| 3. | Bhaddanta Sīhanāda | | Sudhammā Sect | Member |
| 4. | Bhaddanta Vilāsābhivaṃsa | | Sudhammā Sect | Member |
| 5. | Bhaddanta Paññasāmi | | Sudhammā Sect | Member |
| 6. | Bhaddanta Vilāsa | | Sudhammā Sect | Member |
| 7. | Bhaddanta Paññāsīha | | Sudhammā Sect | Member |
| 8. | Bhaddanta Sujāta | | Sudhammā Sect | Member |
| 9. | Bhaddanta Paṇḍavaṃsa | | Sudhammā Sect | Member |
| 10. | Bhaddanta Varañāna | | Sudhammā Sect | Member |
| 11. | Bhaddanta Paññāsīhālaṅkārābhivaṃsa | | Sudhammā Sect | Member |
| 12. | Bhaddanta Āciṇṇa | | Sudhammā Sect | Member |
| 13. | Bhaddanta Paññāsāmi | | Sudhammā Sect | Member |
| 14. | Bhaddanta Indavaṃsa | | Sudhammā Sect | Member |
| 15. | Bhaddanta Saddhammodaya | | Sudhammā Sect | Member |

== Functions ==
The Committee administers and regulates the Burmese Sangha:

- Monk and monastery management: It collects nationwide data on monasteries and monks, primarily through the annual Rains Retreat (Vassa) Sangha List. Monasteries must report each monk's name, age, and ordination year, and monks must present their ID cards. This ensures accurate records of monastic residency and population, and the condition of Buddhist monasteries.
- Religious court system: It adjudicates cases involving violations of the Vinaya (monastic code), including civil disputes, criminal acts (e.g., theft, sexual misconduct, false enlightenment claims), and doctrinal issues. Courts operate at township, state/regional, and national levels.
- Doctrinal oversight and censorship: It determines what constitutes orthodox and heterodox teachings. All Buddhist publications in Myanmar are subject to censorship, and monks promoting heterodox doctrines may be banned from preaching, disrobed, or arrested.

== List of Chairmen ==
1. Indācāra (Bago Myoma Sayadaw): 1980-1993
2. Sobhita (Myingyan Sayadaw): 1994-2004
3. Kumara (Magwe Sayadaw): 2004-2010
4. Kumārābhivaṃsa (Banmaw Sayadaw): 2010-2024
5. Candimābhivaṃsa (Thanlyin Mingyaung Sayadaw): 2024–present

== Controversies ==
In theory, the Committee oversees violations of the Vinaya, the traditional regulatory framework of Theravada Buddhist monks. This body has been used by the government to curtail monks' involvement in non-religious affairs. The Committee has the power to disrobe monks who have violated its decrees and edicts as well as Vinaya regulations and laws, and expel monks from their resident monasteries.

During the Saffron Revolution in 2007, the Committee announced new regulations to prohibit monks from participating in secular affairs.

In December 2009, the Committee banned advertisements of Dhamma talks and lectures held by monks, including posters.

In February 2012, Shwenyawa Sayadaw (ရွှေညဝါဆရာတော်), the abbot of the Sadhu Pariyatti Monastery, was evicted from his monastery by the Committee for alleged disobedience, by holding a sermon at the Mandalay office of the National League for Democracy in September, where he had publicly called for the release of political prisoners and the end of ongoing civil wars, despite sending the Committee an apology where he had asked for a repeal. In December 2011, he had met with Hillary Clinton, US Secretary of State, along with other civil society delegates.

In February 2012, U Gambira, a prominent monk in the Saffron Revolution was accused by the Committee for committing the offences of illegal squatting and breaking and entering of monasteries, and subsequently arrested by secular authorities.
