= List of Thai forest monastics =

This is a list of notable monastics within the Thai Forest Tradition, also known as the Kammaṭṭhāna Tradition.

== Bhikkhus ==
=== Dhammayuttika Nikāya ===
Ajahn Sao Kantasīlo	(1861–1941)
Ajahn Mun Bhūridatta	(1870–1949)
Ajahn Waen Suciṇṇo	(1887–1985)
Ajahn Thate Desaransi	(1902–1994)
Ajahn Lee Dhammadharo	(1907–1961)
Ajahn Maha Bua	(1913–2011)
Ajahn Fuang Jotiko	(1915–1986)
Ajahn Suwat Suvaco	(1919–2002)
Ṭhānissaro Bhikkhu	(1949–)

=== Mahā Nikāya ===
Ajahn Chah	(1918–1992)
Ajahn Sumedho	(1934–)
Ajahn Khemadhammo	(1944–)
Ajahn Viradhammo	(1947–)
Ajahn Pasanno	(1949–)
Ajahn Sucitto	(1949–)
Ajahn Brahm	(1951–)
Ajahn Amaro	(1956–)
Ajahn Jayasāro	(1958–)
Ajahn Sujato	(1966–)

== Sīladhārās ==
Ajahn Sundara	(1946–)
Ajahn Candasiri	(1947–)
