= List of sanghas in San Diego County, California =

This is a list of sanghas in San Diego County, California. All major branches of Buddhism, Theravada, Mahayana, and Vajrayana, are represented there, as is the Mahayana form Zen, as are Vipassanā and Jōdo Shinshū (Pure Land). There is also a secular Zen sangha. The area is home to monasteries as well as to less formally engaged groups who gather for meditation and community. Siddhārtha Gautama died over 2500 years ago, but the oldest Buddhist organization in San Diego County is less than 100 years old.

== History ==
During 1916, Japanese immigrant Buddhist farmers were killed when what was then named Otay Dam gave way and resulted in the Hatfield Flood. The local Japanese diaspora needed a place to hold religious services and went on to found what they call the oldest Buddhist organization in San Diego County. They met informally until they were able to afford a temple space. First they rented a second-floor room on 6th and Market in May 1926. Boys and girls in costume paraded through downtown to celebrate. Later, in 1931, they dedicated today's Buddhist Temple of San Diego at 2929 Market.

== List ==
Name	School of Buddhism	Founder/Date	Location
Mirror Mind Buddhist Sangha (Center for American Buddhist Practice)	Buddhism (regardless of school), non-sectarian Mahayana	ca. 2005	San Diego
Pacific Seaside Sangha	Buddhism (regardless of school)	Gavin Seedorf (2014)	4666 Cass St San Diego
Dharma Bum Temple	Buddhism (regardless of school)	Jeffrey Zlotnik (2006)	San Diego
Buddha For You	Buddhism (regardless of school)	Jeffrey Zlotnik	San Diego
Vista Zen Center	Zen	White Plum Asanga lineage	Vista
Three Treasures Zen Community	Zen	White Plum lineage	Rancho Peñasquitos
Deer Park Monastery	Zen	Thích Nhất Hạnh (2000)	Escondido
Sweetwater Zen Center	Zen	Anne Seisen Saunders (2000)	National City
Hidden Valley Zen Center	Zen	(1968)	San Marcos
Ensenada Zen Group	Vietnamese Zen		Ensenada, Baja California, Mexico
All People's World Beat Sangha	Plum Village Tradition		World Beat Center
Heart Beat Sangha (People of Color)	Plum Village Tradition		World Beat Center
Open Heart Sangha	Plum Village Tradition	(2010)	First Unitarian Universalist Church of San Diego
Peaceful Shores Sangha	Plum Village Tradition		University Lutheran Church
Compassionate Heart Sangha	Plum Village Tradition		Encinitas
Palomitas de Paz Sangha	Plum Village Tradition		Palomar Unitarian Universalist Fellowship
Really Beneficial Sangha	Plum Village Tradition		Rancho Bernardo/Escondido
Still Ripening Sangha (Order of Interbeing)	Plum Village Tradition		Deer Park Monastery
Metta Forest Monastery	Theravada, Thai Forest Tradition	Ajaan Suwat Suvaco (1991)	Valley Center
Sunnataram California Meditation Monastery	Theravada, Thai tradition	Ajahn Yantra Amaro (1995)	Escondido
Wat Lao Navaram Monastery	Theravada		Linda Vista
Wat Sovannkiry	Cambodian Buddhism		San Diego
UU Meditation Circle	Vipassanā		San Diego, First Unitarian Universalist Church
Unitarian Universalist Fellowship of San Dieguito	Vipassanā		Solana Beach
Buddhist Temple of San Diego	Jōdo Shinshū (Pure Land Buddhism)	(1926, 1931)	Grant Hill
Hsi Fang Temple	Fo Guang Shan	Hsing Yun (1989)	University Heights
Vista Buddhist Temple	Jōdo Shinshū (Pure Land Buddhism)	(1980)	Vista
Kadampa Meditation Center San Diego	New Kadampa Tradition	Geshe Kelsang Gyatso	Point Loma
Diamond Way Buddhist Center	Diamond Way Buddhism	Lama Ole Nydahl (ca. 1972)	University City
Jigme Lingpa Center San Diego	Tibetan, Nyingma, Longchen Nyingthig	Lama Lhanang Rinpoche (2013)	North Park
Tibetan Healing Center, Dzogchen Shri Singha of San Diego, Tsegyalgar West	Tibetan, Drukpa Lineage Dzogchen	Namkhai Norbu (2003)	Hillcrest, Encinitas, Los Cabos, Baja California Sur, Mexico
San Diego Shambhala Meditation Center	Tibetan	Chögyam Trungpa	Kearny Mesa
Karma Thegsum Chöling (San Diego) Buddhist Meditation Center	Tibetan, Karma Kagyu, Vajrayana	16th Karmapa (1977); Closed, 2021	San Diego
San Diego Rigpa	Tibetan	Sogyal Rinpoche	San Diego
Drikung Kyobpa Choling	Tibetan	(1996 or 1997)	Escondido
Zen Center of San Diego	Secular		Pacific Beach
Insight San Diego	Vipassanā	(2014)	Liberty Station
Encinitas Mindfulness Community	Non-sectarian	Founding teacher, Diana Shimkus -2009 everydaymind.com encinitasmindfulness.org	Soul of Yoga, Encinitas
