= Dhammayuttika Nikaya in Indonesia =

Saṅgha Theravāda Dhammayut Indonesia (abbreviated as STDI; Thai: คณะสงฆ์ธรรมยุตในประเทศอินโดนีเซีย, romanized: Khana Song Thammayut nai Prathet Indonesia) is a Theravada Buddhist sangha (monastic community) organization in Indonesia which serves as the official branch of the Dhammayuttika Nikāya, a Theravada order from Thailand. STDI functions as the official representative and successor of the Dhammayuttika Nikāya ordination lineage in Indonesia, as well as an institutional umbrella for monks ordained in this tradition. STDI oversees more than 40 viharas and cetiyas across various regions in Indonesia.

== History ==
=== Background ===
The presence of the Dhammayuttika Nikāya in Indonesia is inseparable from the Dhammadūta (Dhamma envoy) mission sent from Thailand. Since 1969, Thai envoy monks were officially sent to various countries, including Indonesia, to propagate Theravada Buddhism. These envoys originated from the Dhammayuttika Nikāya lineage and were tasked with guiding the laity and training Indonesian monastic candidates.

In 1970, Ven. Somdet Phra Ñāṇasaṁvara directly conferred ordination to Indonesian nationals at Borobudur, which became one of the starting points for the formation of the Theravada community in Indonesia. However, at that time, the monks ordained in the Dhammayuttika lineage did not yet have their own sangha organization, and some joined existing organizations, such as the Sangha Agung Indonesia (Sagin).

On October 23, 1976, Saṅgha Theravāda Indonesia (STI) was formed by five Indonesian monks originating from the Dhammayuttika Nikāya ordination lineage: Bhikkhu Aggabalo, Bhikkhu Khemasaraṇo, Bhikkhu Sudhammo, Bhikkhu Khemiyo, and Bhikkhu Ñāṇavutto. STI was established as an independent sangha organization, separate from Sagin.

In subsequent developments, STDI (Saṅgha Theravāda Dhammayut Indonesia) was established as a sangha organization to specifically accommodate and act as the official representative of the Dhammayuttika Nikāya order in Indonesia, with the support of Dhammadūta from Thailand. Unlike STI, which had been previously established as an independent institutional umbrella for monks who are Indonesian citizens, (Note: Based on the Preamble as well as Article I and Article III of the Saṅgha Theravāda Indonesia Charter according to Saṅgha Theravāda Indonesia 2022, STI was established as an independent institutional umbrella for Theravada monks who are Indonesian citizens. The supreme sovereignty of the organization lies entirely in the hands of the Grand Assembly (Mahāsaṅghasabhā) of STI's internal monks (Article III paragraph 2), without any administrative subordination or direct hierarchical chain of command from any foreign sangha. This distinction in entity is also explicitly recorded in the Mahāthera Samāgama Resolution No. 173/2010 released by Sekretariat Mahāthera Samāgama 2010. The document distinguishes two separate agendas: the annual internal meeting of the Dhammayut Sangha Committee at Vipassana Graha Vihara (Bandung), and a "joint meeting" (joint meeting / การประชุมร่วม) between the Dhammayut Sangha (Thai: คณะสงฆ์ธรรมยุตในประเทศอินโดนีเซีย) and Saṅgha Theravāda Indonesia (Thai: คณะสงฆ์เถรวาทของประเทศอินโดนีเซีย) which was held separately at Mendut Vihara (Yogyakarta).) STDI is structurally connected to and under the guidance and supervision of the Dhammayuttika Nikāya authority in Thailand.

=== Recent developments ===
The existence of STDI as an official sangha organization is recognized by the Government of Indonesia through the Ministry of Religious Affairs and Walubi, which lists STDI as one of the Buddhist institutional organizations in Indonesia alongside other sangha organizations.

STDI actively participates in various national and international religious activities. In 2024 and 2025, STDI was recorded as the organizer of major observances such as Kaṭhina and Māgha Pūjā in Jakarta, attended by thousands of devotees and participated in by dozens of monks from within the country and abroad.

== Organization and leadership ==
STDI comprises monks and samaneras (novice monks) who have been ordained in the Dhammayuttika Nikāya lineage. The organization is also known as Perkumpulan Sangha Theravada Dhammayut Indonesia.

The leadership structure of STDI is headed by a chairman. Based on reports from official Ministry of Religious Affairs sources, the position of Chairman of Perkumpulan Sangha Theravada Dhammayut Indonesia is held by Ven. Bhikkhu Dhammavuddho Thera. STDI is under the guidance of Dhammadūta (Dhamma envoys) from Thailand and maintains a close relationship with the Dhammayuttika Nikāya. One of the key figures who plays a major role in guiding STDI is Ven. Bhikkhu Wongsin Labhiko Mahathera, acting as the Head of Thai Dhammaduta for the Indonesian region.

== Activities ==
STDI actively organizes various religious and social activities, both on a national and international scale.

=== Religious observances ===
STDI routinely organizes major Buddhist observances, including:

- Kaṭhina Bersama: The annual observance of presenting kaṭhina robes to the Sangha. In 2025, STDI held a Joint Kathina at JIExpo Kemayoran, Jakarta, attended by thousands of devotees and over 50 monks.
- Māgha Pūjā: STDI also organizes the Māgha Pūjā Harmony and Blessing celebration, attended by over 700 Buddhists and led by more than 50 Sangha monks, including senior monks (lungpho) from Thailand.

=== Social activities ===
STDI demonstrates social concern through various humanitarian actions. In April 2025, STDI distributed humanitarian aid for earthquake victims in Myanmar in the form of 65 boxes weighing a total of 767.1 kilograms, containing blankets, tarpaulins, first aid kits, medicines, clothing, and various other urgent necessities. This aid was dispatched in collaboration with the TNI using a C-130 Hercules aircraft.

=== Spiritual development ===
STDI is also active in guiding monastic candidates through training programs for samaneras (novice monks) and aṭṭhasīlanīs (women observing the eight precepts). Additionally, STDI monks engage in various spiritual activities such as the thudong tradition (spiritual wandering of monks) traversing various regions in Indonesia.

== List of viharas ==
The following is a list of viharas and cetiyas under STDI's umbrella in Indonesia, as recorded in the official Dhammayuttika Nikāya directory.

List of Dhammayuttika Temples in Indonesia
No	Name (Thai)	Name (Indonesian/Latin)	Location (City/Regency)	Province
DKI Jakarta
1	วัดพุทธเมตตา	Vihara Buddha Metta Arama	Central Jakarta	DKI Jakarta
2	วัดพุทธธรรม	Vihara Buddha Dhamma Citaviriyo	North Jakarta	DKI Jakarta
3	วัดเฮมาทิโร เมตตาวตี	Vihara Hemadhiro Mettavati	West Jakarta	DKI Jakarta
4	วัดสามัคคีธรรม	Vihara Samakkhidham	West Jakarta	DKI Jakarta
5	วัดปัญญาสิกขา	Vihara Pannasikkha	West Jakarta	DKI Jakarta
6	สำนักสงฆ์ รูมาฮ์ เกอซาดารัน	Cetiya Rumah Kesadaran	West Jakarta	DKI Jakarta
7	สำนักสงฆ์ติรตนะ ปารมี	Cetiya Tiratana Parami	North Jakarta	DKI Jakarta
8	สำนักสงฆ์สารีปุตตา มหากิตติคุณาราม	Cetiya Sariputta Maha Kittikunaram	East Jakarta	DKI Jakarta
9	สำนักสงฆ์อนาถะ ปิณฑิกะ	Cetiya Anathapindika	West Jakarta	DKI Jakarta
Banten
10	วัดสิทธัตถะ	Vihara Siddharta	South Tangerang	Banten
11	วัดเนกขัมมาราม	Vihara Nekkhamma Forest Meditation Centre	Tangerang	Banten
12	สำนักสงฆ์ธรรมทายาท	Cetiya Dhammadayada	Tangerang	Banten
13	สำนักสงฆ์มหากุสลา โปริส	Cetiya Maha Kusala Poris	Tangerang	Banten
14	สำนักสงฆ์พุทธชัยมงคล	Cetiya Buddha Jaya Manggala	Tangerang	Banten
West Java
15	วัดวิปัสสนาคราหะ	Vihara Vipassana Graha	West Bandung	West Java
16	วัดปอนด่อก เมดิตาซี อัสรี จากาสัมปูรนา	Vihara Pondok Meditasi Asri Jakasampurna	West Bekasi	West Java
17	วัดเวสสันดร	Vihara Vessantara	Bekasi	West Java
18	วัดพุทธชยันตี	Vihara Buddha Jayanti	Bekasi	West Java
19	วัดมหาวิริยะอารามะ	Vihara Maha Viriya Arama	Bogor	West Java
20	วัดสันติสุขอารามะ	Vihara Santi Sukha Arama	Bogor	West Java
21	สำนักสงฆ์สวนมิตรภาพ	Kebun Persahabatan	Purwakarta	West Java
22	สำนักสงฆ์สังฆเมตตา อารามะ	Cetiya Sangha Metta Arama	Bogor	West Java
Central Java
23	วัดวิสมาภิกขุ จายาวิชยะ	Vihara Wisma Bhikkhu Jayawijaya	Temanggung	Central Java
24	วัดเอกะธรรมโลกา	Vihara Eka Dhammaloka	Jepara	Central Java
25	วัดปอนด่อกภันเตวิญญ์	Vihara Pondok Bhante Win	Magelang	Central Java
26	วัดธรรมกุสุมา	Vihara Dhammakusuma	Cilacap	Central Java
East Java
27	วัดพุทธวิริโย	Vihara Buddhaviriyo	Surabaya	East Java
Bali
28	วัดวิสมาสมณะ	Vihara Wisma Samana	(not specified)	Bali
North Sumatra
29	วัดลาภิโก บุดดิส เซ็นเตอร์	Labhiko Buddhist Centre	Medan	North Sumatra
30	วัดโบโรบุดูร์	Vihara Borobudur	Medan	North Sumatra
31	วัดศากยมุนี	Vihara Sakyamuni ITBC	Deli Serdang	North Sumatra
32	วัดพุทธสุชาตา	Vihara Buddha Sujata	Medan	North Sumatra
33	วัดรักขิตะวนา บุดดิส เซ็นเตอร์	Rakkhitavana Buddhist Centre	Deli Serdang	North Sumatra
34	วัดอโศการาม บุดดิส เซ็นเตอร์	Asokarama Buddhist Centre	Langkat	North Sumatra
35	วัดชาติศากยะ เมติตาซี เซ็นเตอร์	Jatisakya Meditation Centre	Deli Serdang	North Sumatra
36	วัดสวาร์นา ดุวิปะ	Vihara Swarna Dwipa	Asahan	North Sumatra
37	สำนักสงฆ์บุดดิส เมดิเตชั่นเซ็นเตอร์ (บีเอ็มซี)	Buddhist Mediation Center (BMC)	Medan	North Sumatra
Riau
38	วัดธรรมเมตตา	Vihara Dhamma Metta Arama	Pekanbaru	Riau
Jambi
39	วัดวิมุตตระ	Vihara Vimuttara	Jambi	Jambi
Bangka Belitung Islands
40	วัดบังก้าธรรมาราม	Vihara Bangka Dhammaram	Bangka	Bangka Belitung Islands
41	สำนักสงฆ์ปุสดิกัส พุทธเบอลิตุง	Pusdiklat Buddha Belitung	Belitung	Bangka Belitung Islands
North Sulawesi
42	วัดธรรมทีปะ มานาโด	Vihara Dhammadipa Manado	Manado	North Sulawesi
Gorontalo
43	วัดพุทธธรรม โกรอนตาโล	Vihara Buddha Dharma	Gorontalo	Gorontalo
Papua
44	วัดธรรมชัย ปาปัว	Vihara Cycloop Dhammajaya Sentani	Jayapura	Papua

== See also ==
- Dhammayuttika Nikāya
- Saṅgha Theravāda Indonesia
- Sangha Agung Indonesia
- Majelis Agama Buddha Theravada Indonesia
