= Phra Phimontham =

Thai Buddhist monk (1901–1992)

Phra Phimontham (Thai: พระพิมลธรรม; 1901–1992) was a Thai monk of the Mahanikay order. Phra Phimontham served as the abbot of Wat Mahathat in Bangkok from 1947 until 1960. He was a proponent of vipassana meditation, and traveled frequently between Thailand and Burma. Phimontham also gained a reputation as a pro-democratic monk, which garnered resistance from both the Thai government and the Thai sangha. In 1962, Phimontham was forcefully disrobed, imprisoned, and charged with being a communist.

== Early life and education ==
Phra Aat Asaphathera or Aat Asabho (lay name Aat Duangmala) was born in 1901 in the village of Bahn Don in the northeastern Thai province of Khon Kaen, the oldest of four children born to Phim and Jae Duangmala. Despite his origins in this rural and predominantly Lao-speaking region, far from the Bangkok establishment, he proved to be a capable student and scholar. After ordination in the Mahanikay order in 1914, Phra Aat advanced quickly through the monastic ranks. In 1929, he reached the eighth level of the parian system, a series of examinations for monks which involved memorization and literal translation of Pali texts into Thai and vice versa.

Three years later, in 1932, Phra Aat was appointed the abbot of a monastery in Ayutthaya, a city about 40 miles north of Bangkok, and was later promoted to provincial abbot and again to Ayutthaya province’s Sangha Provincial Governor.

== Early monastic career ==
=== Historical situation ===
While Phra Aat was completing his monastic examinations and beginning as an abbot in Ayutthaya, the aftershock of the 1929 financial crash in the United States was moving toward Thailand. Imports and exports were significantly reduced, and as the primary source of Thailand’s income was taxation on such trade, state finances were seriously affected. Subsequent budget cuts and governmental layoffs frustrated the growing Thai middle class. Thailand’s financial woes, combined with King Prajadhipok’s lack of an heir, and a lingering prophecy made during the reign of Rama I that the Chakri dynasty would only last for 150 years, until 1932, compelled the shift to constitutionalism. The draft constitution, which Prajadhipok planned to announce on the 150th anniversary of Chakri rule, was rejected outright by council of princes, and Prajadhipok was left in power. The absolute monarchy only stood for several more months, until the Promoters, a group of non-royal army officers and civil servants led by Plaek Phibunsongkhram (Phibun), took over governance in the Siamese Revolution in June 1932.

This group of revolutionaries was mixed ideologically; though they wanted to remove the king from the throne and replace the monarchy with constitutional government, their objectives were not concrete. The initial government was a constitutional monarchy, which kept Prajadhipok as its head. Prince Boworadej attempted to lead a rebellion against the government in 1933 to replace the king, but his attempt was crushed by Phibun and his allies.

=== Advancement, politics, and loyalties ===
Phra Aat was appointed Sangha Regional Governor of the Central Region in 1943. Several years later, in 1946, he was awarded a Phra Ratchakhana title (senior clerical title awarded by the Thai king), and in 1947 a Rorng Somdet title (“Deputy Somdet,” the second-highest title for a Thai monk, after the sangharaja and the Somdet rank). This Phra Ratchakhana title, Phimontham, is the name by which he is most widely known.

Phimontham continued to ascend the ranks of the sangha hierarchy. By this time, he had also gained a reputation as a strongly pro-democratic monk, with a wide base of support that included farmers and the expanding middle class. He cultivated a close relationship with Prime Minister Pridi Banomyong. Pridi's home province was Ayutthaya, where Phimontham had been appointed Provincial Governor right around the time of the revolution in 1932. Phimontham had also become acquainted with Phibun himself, who both preceded and followed Pridi's tenure, despite the rivalry between the two politicians. This relationship was hugely beneficial to Phimontham's career, and strengthened ties between Phibun's government and Wat Mahathat, where he was abbot.

At the same time, Phra Phimontham developed bad blood with certain high-ranking monks within the sangha. Although tensions between the two major orders—Thammayut and Mahanikay—were significant, jealousy and competition from other monks were also at play, and would prove consequential in the decade to come.

=== Meditation work and travels ===
Phra Phimontham was responsible for initiating the rise of meditation among both the laity and the clergy in the 1950s. Over the span of only two years (Ford 78), he traveled to Burma more than a dozen times to study and disseminate Burmese teachings of vipassana, or insight, meditation, a method developed by the Burmese monk and meditation master Mahasi Sayadaw.

At Wat Mahathat, Phimontham founded a vipassana training center and he later established similar centers in the provinces, like in Chanthaburi in 1954. He also acted as the leading Thai representative for the Sixth Great Buddhist Synod in Rangoon from 1954 to 1956, a two-year-long assembly of clergy marking Buddhism's 2,500th anniversary. As an expression of gratitude for his service and devotion, the Burmese government bestowed upon Phimontham the title of akkomhaabandit, or “supreme scholar,” a title never before awarded to a Thai monk.

Phra Phimontham's peregrinations were not limited to Buddhism alone. He was involved with Moral Re-Armament, a movement founded by American minister Frank Buchman that focused on individual spiritual transformation through moral elevation. MRA representatives from 14 countries convened on Bangkok's Chulalongkorn University in 1954, at the invitation of Phibun's government, for a regional Southeast Asian convention. While in Bangkok, the delegates paid a visit to Wat Mahathat, where Phimontham was abbot. Evidently taken by the movement's “Four Absolutes” of honesty, purity, unselfishness, and love, and their accordance with Buddhist teachings, Phimontham later set out on his own MRA world tour—to the United States, the Philippines, Japan, India, and Europe—in 1958.

With such experiences of world travel, Phimontham envisioned a future in which monks would commonly travel and study in other Buddhist countries. In 1953, he prepared to send a group of young monks abroad—possibly to Sri Lanka—and so asked for the blessing of the Sangha Prime Minister, Plot Kittisophana. Kittisophana bluntly declined to bless the monks, and replied that the best form of Buddhism already existed in Thailand. The monastic exchange programs that Phimontham proposed were unsettling to other monks within the Thai sangha, some of whom were increasingly taking issue with his successes. Except now, not only were his exceptionally strong ties with Burma or his democratic leanings any longer the sole issue, but so was the way he practiced Buddhism.

Vipassana meditation, which takes inspiration from the Mahāsatipaṭṭhāna Sutta, is rooted strongly in the Pali canon, instead of in traditional Buddhist practices. In effect, by tracing legitimacy of practice to the canonical word of the Buddha and bypassing the state-sponsored traditions of the establishment, and encouraged the cultivation of an individualistic spirit among vipassana practitioners, Phimontham's teachings threatened the stability and political function of modern state Buddhism in Thailand.

== Controversy and disrobing ==
=== History of state sangha control ===
The Thai state’s control of Buddhism increased notably during the second half of the 19th century with the spread of commercial rice production and introduction of the market economy. To adequately train an emerging mercantile workforce, King Chulalongkorn implemented a new primary education plan.

A significant part of this project involved the centralization of the monasteries under more direct supervision by the crown. In an effort to suppress regionalism, strengthen Thai culture against outside influences like foreign missionaries, and broaden the base of state control, King Chulalongkorn sponsored the Royal Education Acts and the Sangha Act of 1902. These directives brought northern monks under the dominion of the central Buddhist administration based out of Bangkok. Further, it was decided that educational materials would be written in the Thai language and script and disseminated from the capital. The multi-tiered exam system—of three nak dham tiers of Buddhist studies, which were a prerequisite for the nine parian levels of Pali studies, organized by Prince Wachirayan—through which Phra Aat excelled was the result of these standardizing decrees. Only students who had been certified by this governmental system of education and examination could enter the fold of monkhood.

While the 1902 Sangha Act expressed that monks of both the Thammayut and Mahanikay orders could govern and be governed by each other, it was always the case that Thammayut monks held positions of power in the sangha. This pronouncement caused significant frustration among many of the Mahanikaya monks, who, especially after the 1932 revolution, considered such centralized authority to be an anachronism.

With the Sangha Act of 1941, Chulalongkorn’s model was replaced by one based on the democratic pattern of the new government. Sangharaja Chinaworasiriwat was succeeded after his death by the Mahanikay monk Phae Tissathewo, who proved more receptive to new legislation regarding the sangha. Mahanikay monks considered the 1941 Sangha Act to be a constitution, which in form and function mirrored the secular government’s new constitution and which administered democracy to the Buddhist religious order in Thailand. Monks of the much smaller Thammayut order, however, were not so satisfied with the direction set after the 1941 Sangha Act: as Jackson writes, “throughout the 1950s Thammayut monks persistently criticized the new sangha structure as obstructing the Sangharaja, whom they regarded as the rightful chief administrator of the sangha, from fulfilling his duties."

Thus in 1962, after Sarit Thanarat assumed power through the 1957 coup, the administration of the sangha returned to a recentralized system reminiscent of the one from Chulalongkorn’s reign. Phibun had been in support of the 1941 Sangha Act. Sarit, on the other hand, believed that the democratic experiment of the past two decades had been wasted effort, and that democracy was not the best path forward for Thailand; instead, it was through the enhancement of Buddhism and the monarchy that national integration would succeed. To this end, Sarit banned political parties and instituted martial law.

=== Resistance to state orders ===
Before Sarit took control, Phibun ordered the Sanghasabha (Sangha Council) to pass a decree outlawing the ordination of communists. Since Phra Phimontham had been elected as one of the Sangha Ministers, he was responsible for carrying out the order. However, Phimontham objected on doctrinal grounds, saying that such a decree was inconsistent with Buddhist principles: in his words, all should be accepted, communist or not.

Phra Phimontham’s reputation by this point was evident and well-established. He became the abbot of Wat Mahathat, the most significant Mahanikay temple, in 1947. Additionally, he oversaw King Bhumibol’s ordination in 1956, and was regarded as a possible candidate for the position of sangharaja (supreme patriarch). For such a high-ranking monk to refuse to cooperate was a significant threat to the state.

=== Plot Kittisophana, arrest, and defrocking ===
Sangharaja Suchitto died in 1958. His presumed heir was the sangha prime minister at that time, Plot Kittisophana, who filled in as acting sangharaja during the two-year period between Suchitto’s death and his cremation. However, Kittisophana’s position would be left vacant when he moved up, and the next in command would be Phimontham, whose increased power would prove an even more serious threat to the state’s power. Kittisophana had proven relatively receptive to the palace’s instructions, and also harbored a personal dislike of Phimontham and his success. Thus when Pin Malakul and Prince Dhani Nivat offered Kittisophana a promotion in exchange for interrupting Phimontham’s rise, he readily agreed. Just days after Kittisophana was appointed as sangharaja, he named Juan Uttayi as the prime minister of the sangha, not Phimontham.

In 1960, two scandals had rocked the clerical establishment. The one case involved the criticism of Kittisophana and his underhanded dealings by a series of anonymous leaflets, while the other had to do with two monks from Wat Mahathat who visited China, allegedly delivered broadcasts in favor of communism, and brought back communist propaganda materials. Phimontham was caught up in both cases: accused in the first, and implicated in the second because of his residence at Wat Mahathat.

In this climate, several weeks after Kittisophana’s official appointment, the sangha announced a new policy set to get rid of communist monks. Before long, Phimontham was arrested on charges of sodomy, improper dress, and communist sympathies, and ordered to disrobe. Phimontham refused, so was Sarit and Pin Malakul dislodged him as abbot of Wat Mahathat and stripped him of all his clerical titles. After a committee of monks investigated the allegations, and the two accusers confessed that they had fabricated their stories, Phimontham was released.

Kittisophana in the meantime, repealed the 1941 Sangha Act. He worked to write a new sangha act modeled on Chulalongkorn’s 1902 version, which eliminated the sangha prime minister and cabinet—the democratic features that had been implemented into monastic governance twenty years earlier—and aligned the sangha once again with the palace. Once these administrative changes had been made, on June 20, 1962, Phimontham was declared a threat to national security and the activities and popularity of Mahanikay meditation “politically subversive.” He was arrested again, disrobed by force in a police station, with Sarit and two Thammayut monks looking on, and subsequently jailed. During his imprisonment, Phimontham wore white robes, and patiently noted that “I stay here for free. I have free electricity, and free water. The police take care of me for free, and if I die my coffin and my cremation will be paid for… How could I not be anything but happy and relaxed?”

Phra Phimontham’s disrobing was so notable because in the past, monks, unlike politicians, nearly always held roles for life. Monks appointed under a previous political regime would continue to hold their office, regardless of how strongly unsympathetic they were to the new one, as the sanctity of their roles was acknowledged and upheld. Previous monks had been defrocked, so there was not a complete lack of precedent: in 1933, a year after the revolution, members of the Khana Patisangkhorn Phra Saasanna (Group to Restore the Religion) were disrobed. However, this earlier incident did not target such a high-ranking monk, nor so singularly.

== Later career and legacy ==
Phimontham was the subject of continued harassment into the 1970s and 1980s, as attempts to rehabilitate him were consistently obstructed. His case became a rallying point for lay people unhappy with the sangha’s centralized structure, and a symbol of the frustration of many young monks with the conservative sangha hierarchy. In 1975, the Mahatherasamakhon decided that there were no outstanding charges against Phimontham, and on February 22, 1975, the Sangharaja restored his titles and conferred a new set of robes. Sulak Sivarak claims that Kukrit Pramoj’s government wanted not only to reinstate Phimontham, but to promote him to the rank of Somdet, which would have given him a place on the Mahatherasamakhon. However, King Bhumibol evidently refused at this point because Phimontham’s “fate was not consistent with that of the King.”

After nearly a decade of delays and quarreling within the sangha about Phimontham’s promotion and the filling of positions of deceased monks, Phimontham was conferred the title of Somdet Phra Phutthajan on December 5, 1985. Around this time, Paul Handley writes that “it was now clear that Bhumibol himself opposed Phimontham. The monk was 83, and the palace hoped he would, like Pridi, soon die.” Indeed, Phimontham did die several years later, and Yanasangworn, a conservative monk of the Thammayut order, was left unopposed as sangharaja.

Despite Phimontham’s ill favor with the Thai establishment, his legacy has continued on; the leaders of the 2009 and 2010 Red Shirt rallies often invoked Phimontham as a martyr.

== Notes ==
=== Explanatory notes ===
1. Derived from the Pali pariñña (“full understanding”), which also produced the Thai ปริญญา (bpà-rin-yaa; “degree”), now used to refer to a degree certificate.
2. There are two principal orders in Thai Buddhism: Thammayut, representing the establishment, and Mahanikay, representing by the Thai people (Krajaang). The Mahanikay order is far and away the most widespread of the two today, accounting for around 90% of monks. Still, however, as was the case in the early 20th century, the majority of sangharajas have been drawn from the monarchy-backed Thammayut order.
3. The extent of the change in sangha structure is debated. Yoneo Ishii argues that the change in 1941 (and in 1962) was minor, but Peter Jackson disagrees (Jackson 64).
4. Supreme Sangha Council, which was created by the 1902 Sangha Act, done away with, and later reinstated by the 1962 Sangha Act.

== General and cited references ==
- Cook, Joanna (2010). Meditation in Modern Buddhism. Cambridge: Cambridge University Press. ISBN 978-0-521-11938-2.
- Dubus, Arnaud. “Polarization and Crisis in the Twenty-First Century.” In Buddhism and Politics in Thailand. Bangkok: Institut de recherche sur l’Asie du Sud-Est contemporaine, 2018. https://doi.org/10.4000/books.irasec.2976.
- Ford, Eugene (2017). Cold War Monks: Buddhism and America's Secret Strategy in Southeast Asia. New Haven, CT: Yale University Press. ISBN 978-0-300-21856-5.
- Gabaude, Louis. Une herméneutique bouddhique contemporaine de Thaïlande: Buddhadasa Bhikkhu. Paris: Ecole Française d’Extrême-Orient, 1988.
- Gosling, David L. (2020). Science and Development in Thai and South Asian Buddhism. Abingdon, Oxon.: Routledge. ISBN 978-0-429-62684-5.
- Handley, Paul M. (2006). The King Never Smiles: A Biography of Thailand's Bhumibol Adulyadej. New Haven, CT: Yale University Press. ISBN 978-6-611-73073-4.
- Ishii, Yoneo (1968). "Church and State in Thailand". Asian Survey. 8 (10): 864–871.
- Jackson, Peter A. (1989). Buddhism, Legitimation, and Conflict: The Political Functions of Urban Thai Buddhism in the 19th and 20th Centuries. Singapore: Institute of Southeast Asian Studies. ISBN 978-9-814-38036-2.
- Keyes, Charles F. (1989). "Buddhist Politics and Their Revolutionary Origins in Thailand". International Political Science Review. 10 (2): 121–142.
- McCargo, Duncan (2012). "The Changing Politics of Thailand's Buddhist Order". Critical Asian Studies. 44 (4): 627–42. doi:10.1080/14672715.2012.738544.
- McDaniel, Justin. “Monastic Education.” Thai Digital Monastery. Penn Arts and Sciences. Internet Archive, 21 April 2021. Accessed 25 October 2024.
- Natayada na Songkhla. “Style and Ascetics: Attractiveness, Power and the Thai Sangha.” PhD diss., SOAS University of London, 1999.
- The Pali Text Society’s Pali-English Dictionary. Pali Text Society. London. Chipstead, 1921–1925. https://dsal.uchicago.edu/dictionaries/pali/.
- Satasut, Prakirati (2015). "Dharma on the Rise: Lay Buddhist Associations and the Traffic in Meditation in Contemporary Thailand". Rian Thai: International Journal of Thai Studies. 8: 173–207.
- Sulak Sivarak, “Karanii Phra Phimontham Wat Mahathat” [The case of Phra Phimontham of Wat Mahathat], Matichon Sut Sapdaa, 5 Kumphaaphan 2527 [February 1984], p. 17.
- Tambiah, Stanley Jerajaya. World Conqueror and World Renouncer. Of Cambridge Studies in Social and Cultural Anthropology. Cambridge: Cambridge University Press, 1976.
- Turton, Andrew. “Limits of Ideological Domination and the Formation of Social Consciousness.” In History and Peasant Consciousness in Southeast Asia, Senri Ethnological Series no. 13, edited by Andrew Turton and Shigeharu Tanabe, pp. 19–73. Osaka: National Museum of Ethnology, 1984.
