= Buddha For You =

Antique Buddhist statuary store and gift shop

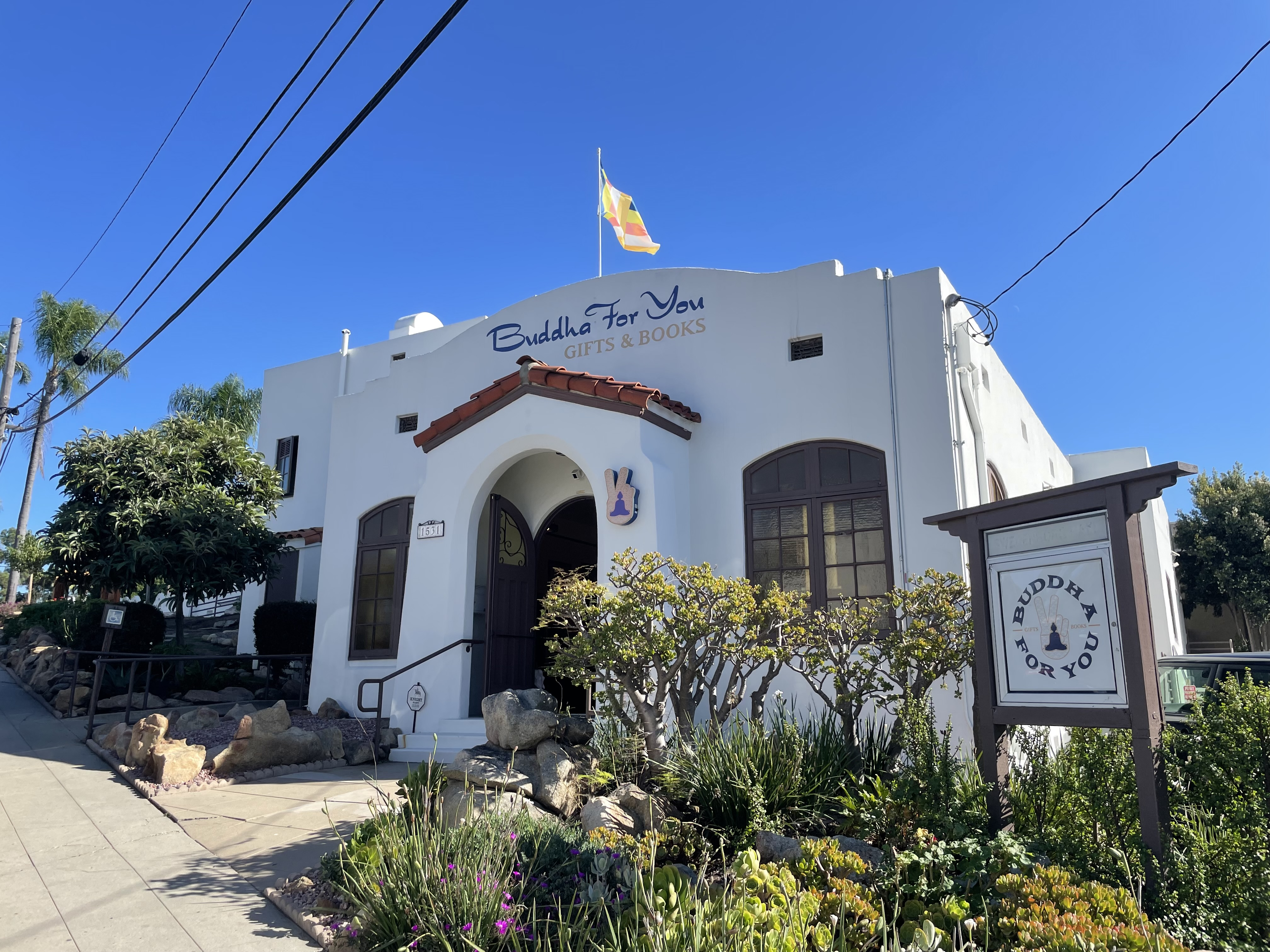
- Buddha For You exterior in 2025

Religion
- Affiliation: Buddhism

Location
- Location: University Heights, San Diego
- State: California
- Interactive map of Buddha For You
- Coordinates: 32.7532646594453°N 117.14902254238874°W

Buddha For You is an antique Buddhist statuary store and gift shop in San Diego, California. The store offers a collection of existing and custom Buddhist statuary items and has been operating free meditation classes since 2009. The gift shop is best known for its role in the development of the first Buddhist college fraternity in the United States, Delta Beta Tau, at San Diego State University (SDSU).

== History ==
The store was founded in 1998 by an elderly couple in the Campus Plaza Shopping center near San Diego State University (SDSU), in the same plaza as a Thai restaurant also owned by the couple. When the original owners planned on retiring in 2009, they asked the founders of Dharma Bum Temple to take over Buddha For You. The founders were reluctant to take on running the store, but agreed hoping it would assist with their temple work and create revenue for the temple. After Buddha For You was acquired by Dharma Bum Temple, the temple set up free meditation classes at the shop. The shop was not profitable but its free meditation classes became popular among college students from the nearby college campus of SDSU, with students eventually starting a meditation club on campus as a result. In 2011, the store moved to another building in the same plaza, which was done in the style of a pilgrimage. Over 150 people joined the move, which was led a Tibetan lama chanting om mani padme hum as volunteers carried the store inventory into location by foot.

In September 2015, SDSU students who regularly attended the meditation classes at Buddha For You began a Buddhist college fraternity at the suggestion of store co-owner Jeffrey Zlotnik. The co-ed fraternity, Delta Beta Tau, became the first Buddhist college fraternity in the United States. In 2017, the gift shop moved again, consolidating into the first floor of Dharma Bum Temple, which had moved locations, and transferred its status to a non-profit.
