= Mettā Forest Monastery =

Theravada Buddhist monastery in Valley Center, California

Religion
- Affiliation: Thai Forest Tradition

Location
- Location: 13560 Muutama Lane Valley Center, CA 92082
- Country: United States
- Interactive map of Mettā Forest Monastery
- Coordinates: 33.3261°N 117.0353°W

Architecture
- Founder: Ajaan Suwat Suvaco
- Completed: 1990

Website
- http://www.watmetta.org/

Mettā Forest Monastery, also known as Mettāvanārāma or Wat Mettā, is a Theravāda monastery in Valley Center, California. It was founded in 1991 by Ajaan Suwat Suvaco (1919–2002) along with his student Ṭhānissaro Bhikkhu. Ajaan Ṭhānissaro has been the resident abbot since 1993. Currently there are ten resident bhikkhus, nine American bhikkhus and one Thai, as well as space for lay Buddhists on overnight retreat.

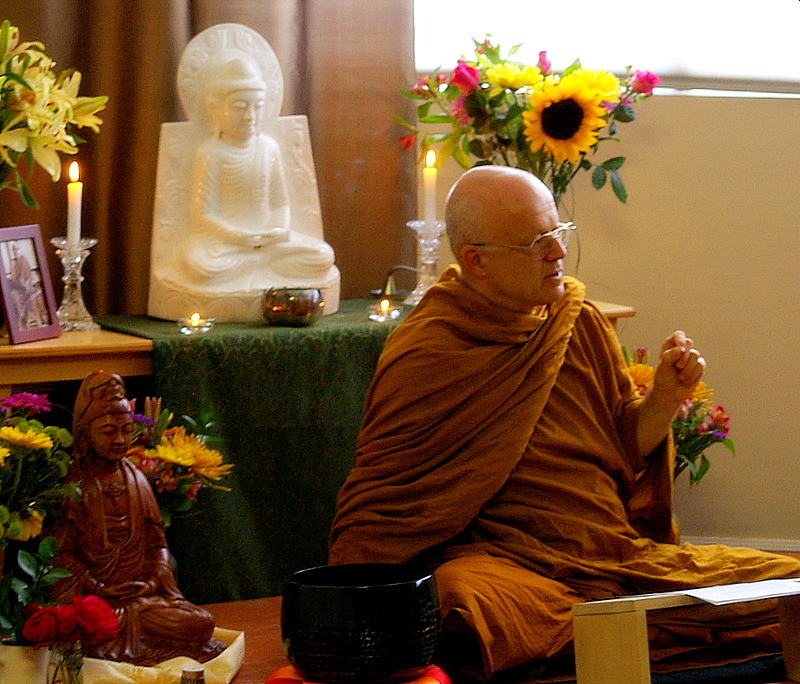
Ajaan Thānissaro giving a talk

Ajaan Ṭhānissaro stresses the importance of strict adherence to the Vinaya or Buddhist monastic code which teaches relying only on donations from the lay community as well as living in the wilderness, a key feature of the Thai Forest Tradition of which he is a part. All visitors are expected to follow the Eight Precepts of Buddhism, which helps introduce students into the practice of Theravāda Buddhism.

== Historical Context ==
Even though the Mettā Forest Monastery has not been widely studied, the founding of this monastery is of great importance in establishing Theravāda Buddhism within the United States. Part of the problem of recognizing Buddhism in the US is that many surveys do not allow participants to select their specific school of Buddhism, so it is hard to know how many Theravāda Buddhists there are in the US.

Theravāda Buddhism was only introduced in the US in the late 1960s, much later than when Buddhism was first established in the country. There was an increase of temples being built in the 1980s and 1990s, with Mettā Forest being one of fourteen established in California in the 1990s. The Mettā Forest Monastery was founded thanks to a generous donation of land from someone from Massachusetts, with the expectation that a monastery would be built there. These wishes were carried out as the monastery now draws Buddhists from the surrounding California area. Theravāda Buddhism is practiced in many different ways across the US; congregating in monasteries is just one way to practice Buddhism, and the Mettā Forest Monastery invites laypeople to connect to their religion and community.

== See also ==
- Buddhism in the United States
- Buddhist monasticism
