= Fuang Jotiko =

Thai Buddhist monk (1915–1986)

Ajahn Fuang Jotiko

Personal life
- Born: 1915 Chanthaburi Province
- Died: 1986 (aged 70–71) Rayong Province

Religious life
- Religion: Buddhism
- Order: Dhammayuttika Nikaya
- School: Theravada
- Lineage: Thai Forest Tradition

Senior posting
- Teacher: Ajahn Lee
- Students: Ṭhānissaro Bhikkhu

Ajahn Fuang Jotiko (1915 – 14 May 1986) was a Thai Buddhist monk and abbot in the Thai Forest Tradition of Theravada Buddhism.

Fuang was a student of Ajahn Lee at Wat Asokaram, a monastery near Bangkok. After Ajahn Lee's death in 1961, Fuang continued at Wat Asokaram where he was expected to become abbot. However, in 1965 Fuang left to pursue greater solitude which he felt would improve his meditation practice. About 1971, Fuang moved to Wat Thamma Sathit in Rayong Province, where he lived as abbot until his death in 1986. Fuang's students included American monk Ṭhānissaro Bhikkhu, who studied with him for ten years.

== Published works ==
- Jotiko, Fuang (1999) [1980]. "A Single Mind". Translated by Bhikkhu, Ṭhānissaro. Barre, MA: Barre Center for Buddhist Studies.
- Jotiko, Fuang (1993). Awareness itself: The teachings of Ajaan Fuang Jotiko. Translated by Bhikkhu, Ṭhānissaro. Valley Center, CA: Metta Forest Monastery. OCLC 46311461.
  - Jotiko, Fuang (1999). Awareness itself: The teachings of Ajaan Fuang Jotiko. Translated by Bhikkhu, Ṭhānissaro (Revised ed.). Barre, MA: Barre Center for Buddhist Studies.
- Jotiko, Fuang (1998) [1978]. "Timeless and True". Translated by Bhikkhu, Ṭhānissaro. Barre, MA: Barre Center for Buddhist Studies.
- Jotiko, Fuang (2001) [1984]. "Listen Well". Translated by Bhikkhu, Ṭhānissaro. Barre, MA: Barre Center for Buddhist Studies.
- Jotiko, Fuang; Tanishaluo; Fa yuan bian yi qun (1996). Xi mie zhi shi : a jiang fang de kai shi [When it goes out: Ajaan Fuang's instructions] (in Chinese). Fa yun. ISBN 957-99702-7-0. OCLC 818442585.
