= Dharma Bum Temple =

Buddhist temple in the United States

Coordinates: 32°45′12″N 117°08′56″W

Religion
- Affiliation: Ecumenical Buddhism

Location
- Location: 4144 Campus Ave, University Heights, San Diego, CA 92103
- Country: United States
- Interactive map of Dharma Bum Temple

Website
- www.thedharmabums.org

Dharma Bum Temple is an American Buddhist temple in San Diego, California. The temple focuses on being an introductory center for beginners to learn Buddhism and aims to provide a space for Americans to practice Buddhism in the comfort of their own culture. It has its roots in Taiwanese Buddhism and the Fo Guang Shan order, but identifies with ecumenical Buddhism, or interdenominational Buddhism.

Dharma Bum Temple was founded on New Year's Eve in 2006 by a group of three people. It was originally located in downtown San Diego, where it became popular among locals and college students from the nearby San Diego State University (SDSU). The temple was involved in the founding of the first Buddhist college fraternity in the United States, Delta Beta Tau. Dharma Bum Temple made headlines in local newspapers in 2017 with its campaign to buy the 1927-built Swedenborgian church in University Heights, San Diego, which the temple relocated to later that year.

Dharma Bum Temple holds free meditation and Buddhism classes for the general public and organizes community service events in the area. The temple is known for directing its members to other Buddhist temples in the area based on the forms of Buddhism that interest the person. The temple routinely hosts guest speakers from various traditions of Buddhism and organizes field trips to other Buddhist temples in the area.

== History ==
=== Founding ===
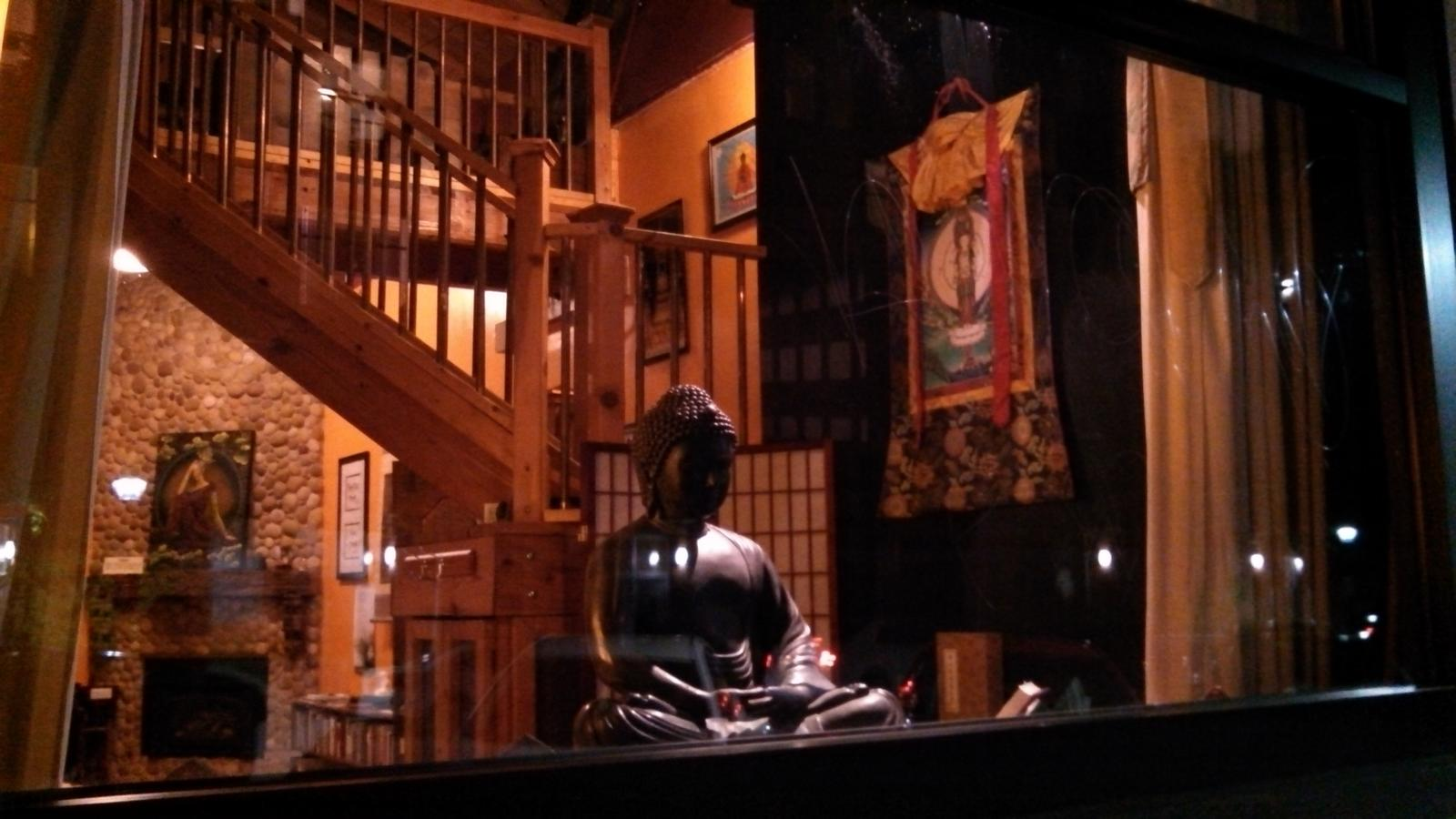
Dharma Bum Temple at its downtown San Diego location in 2014

Dharma Bum Temple was founded by a group who met at a local Buddhist temple in San Diego in 2003. One of the members of the group, Jeffrey Zlotnik, eventually became president of the English-language chapter of the local temple. In 2005, the group went to the Fo Guang Shan monastery in Taiwan to study Buddhism and was invited to open a temple in San Diego under the International Bodhisattva Sangha in 2006. However, due to logistical problems and a lack of funding, the group abandoned the project shortly after opening the temple. Later that year, the group opened its own temple in downtown San Diego under the name "Dharma Bum Center", after the 1958 Jack Kerouac book The Dharma Bums. In September 2008, the temple officially changed its name to Dharma Bum Temple.

=== In downtown San Diego ===
Dharma Bum Temple was located in and operated from downtown San Diego from the end of 2006 to April 2017. When the temple reached maximum capacity in 2008, it attempted to move to a larger location in downtown San Diego, but returned to the original building when the new location was found to not be suitable. In 2009, the temple acquired a Buddhist gift shop near San Diego State University (SDSU) called Buddha for You at the request of the previous owner, who was elderly and wanted somebody to entrust the store to. Although the gift shop rarely generated profit for Dharma Bum Temple, it played a significant role in the expansion of the temple's community. Due to its proximity to SDSU, Dharma Bum Temple and its services at Buddha for You became popular among college students and the temple eventually started holding regular events on the campus. This included the organization of an SDSU meditation club called the "Aztec Dharma Bums" and the founding of the first Buddhist college fraternity in the United States, Delta Beta Tau (ΔΒΤ).

Before the temple relocated, its services were divided between its main building in downtown and the gift shop Buddha for You. The latter hosted two meditation classes a week, attended by about forty participants each. The temple spent five years looking for a place to expand to but was unable to find a suitable location until 2016.

=== Campaign to buy the Swedenborgian Church ===
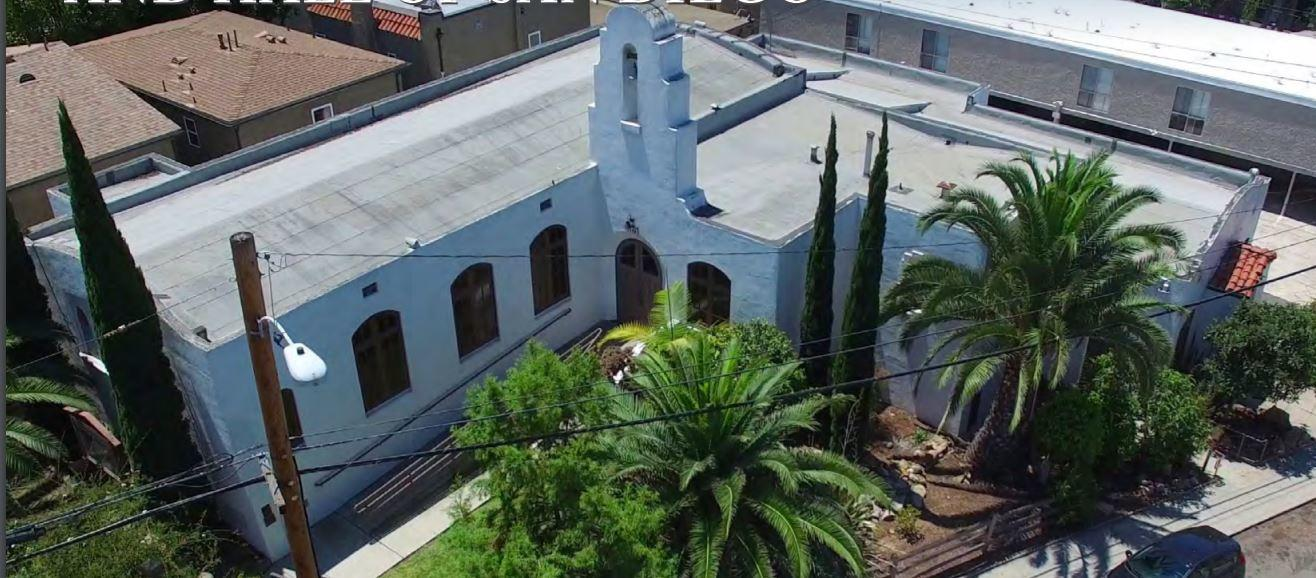
An aerial view of the Swedenborgian Church in University Heights

In October 2016, Dharma Bum Temple started a campaign to purchase the Swedenborgian Church in University Heights, San Diego. According to Dharma Bum Temple co-founder Jeffrey Zlotnik, the church was the ideal place to expand to because it was centrally located near several major neighborhoods and districts in San Diego, was free from downtown San Diego's parking and traffic problems, and was large enough to accommodate the growing congregation.

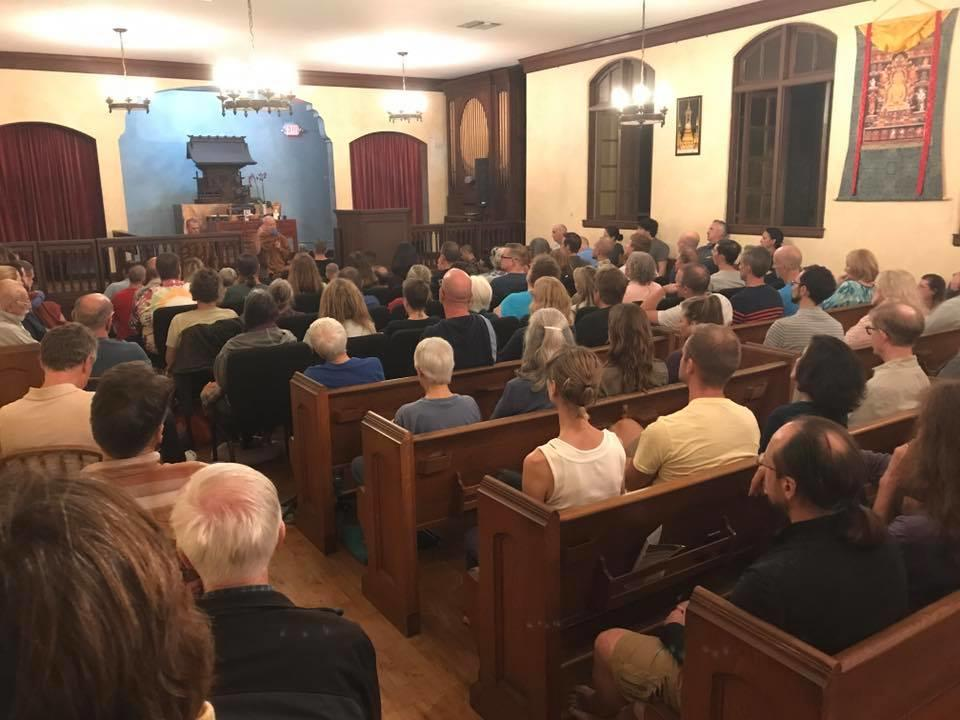
Thanissaro Bhikkhu speaking at the main hall

A developer offered $1.4 million for the church, which Dharma Bum Temple offered to match. However, preference was given to Dharma Bum Temple because the prior owner wanted the church to continue to be used for a spiritual purpose. Although Dharma Bum Temple only had $7,000 at the time, the temple agreed and entered escrow, having to raise $490,000 for the down payment within 108 days. To raise the money, Zlotnik launched a fundraising campaign on Facebook to ask for donations.

The campaign did very well, raising $103,800 from 321 donors in its first two weeks. It caught the attention of several local news outlets in San Diego because the temple and its congregation were able to raise the funds so rapidly. Due to the news coverage, several consultants and organizations contacted Zlotnik to ask for fundraising advice. Dharma Bum Temple received the last string of donations needed to make the down payment on February 14, 2017, the final day of the fundraiser. By the end of the campaign, the temple had raised $497,000 from 1,123 donors in 108 days (about $4,600 per day).

=== Relocation to University Heights ===
After closing escrow, Dharma Bum Temple officially moved to its new location in University Heights on April 15, 2017. Since relocating, the temple consolidated Dharma Bum Temple and its separate gift shop, Buddha for You, as well as all of the services that were held there into the new larger location. The new temple is expected to have three meditation areas and be able hold up to 300 people at one time.

== Services ==
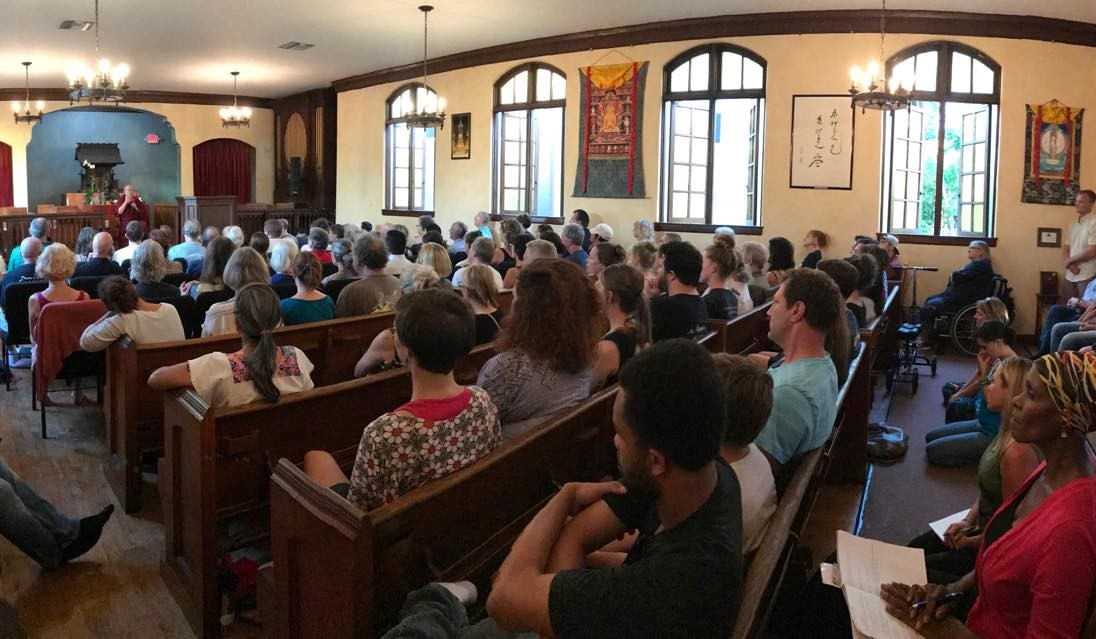
Dharma Bum Temple service with guest speaker Venerable Robina Courtin

Dharma Bum Temple focuses on being an introductory center for westerners to learn Buddhism in a culturally approachable way. The temple avoids pressuring its members into cultural Buddhist practices that may make westerners feel uncomfortable, such as chanting and bowing. Members of the temple refer to themselves as "Dharma Bums". The temple has a policy of welcoming all groups, including other religions. Although it does not identify with any specific school of Buddhism, the temple emphasizes principles of Mahayana Buddhism such as the teachings of the Heart Sutra. Its teachings include overcoming problems and eliminating suffering through meditation and the development of Buddhist principles. Like many temples influenced by Mahayana Buddhism, Dharma Bum Temple stresses the benefit of pursuing the Bodhisattva Path through the cultivation of the Six Mahayana Paramitas.

The temple is known for directing members to other Buddhist temples in the San Diego area after they start showing deeper interest in a particular form of the religion after attending Dharma Bum Temple. It regularly hosts guest speakers from various traditions of Buddhism and holds field trips in the summer to other Buddhist temples in San Diego to introduce attendees to their traditions. The temple also offers introductory classes on Buddhism in Spanish.

Dharma Bum Temple has a strict "no charge" policy and its teachers are instructed to never ask for donations or give a sermon on Dāna, or giving. According to temple co-founder Jeffrey Zlotnik, this policy is in place to avoid pressuring attendees into giving unwillingly, which he says reduces the value of the practice of generosity. As a result, Dharma Bum Temple services are always free of charge and the temple is run solely off of voluntary donations.

The temple's services are attended by a diverse demographic, with its largest demographic being young adult Caucasians. The temple does not actively advertise itself and relies mostly on word of mouth to attract members. Its events are mainly coordinated online through platforms such as Facebook. Dharma Bum Temple focuses on the development of its community around the structure of families, offering individual programs for each age group; including for young children, teenagers, and adults, and has a family program called the "Family Sangha". Along with traditional Buddhist services, Dharma Bum Temple also hosts a Buddhism based support group called the "Recovery Sangha". The program combines elements of the traditional Twelve-Step Program with Buddhism and meditation to help drug and alcohol addicts overcome their addictions. The temple hosts multiple Buddhism and meditation classes throughout the week. As of December 2018, its most popular weekly services were attracting around 70 people per class.

== Community outreach ==
=== Food redistribution ===
Dharma Bum Temple operates a weekly feed the homeless program called "Food Redistribution". The temple and volunteers for the program do not purchase food for the program but instead collect food from stores and farms in the area who would have otherwise thrown it away for not being fresh or being too close to the expiration date. The focus of the program is not just to feed the homeless but also to combat excessive food waste. All food prepared for the Dharma Bum Temple food redistribution program is vegetarian.

=== Prison outreach ===
Since 2006, Dharma Bum Temple regularly visits prisons to teach meditation or Buddhism to inmates in San Diego. The program emphasizes Buddhism as a way to develop traits such as wisdom and compassion, rather than being a Buddhist. The goal of the program is to improve the minds of inmates so they can reintegrate into society more smoothly once they are released from prison.

== Delta Beta Tau ==
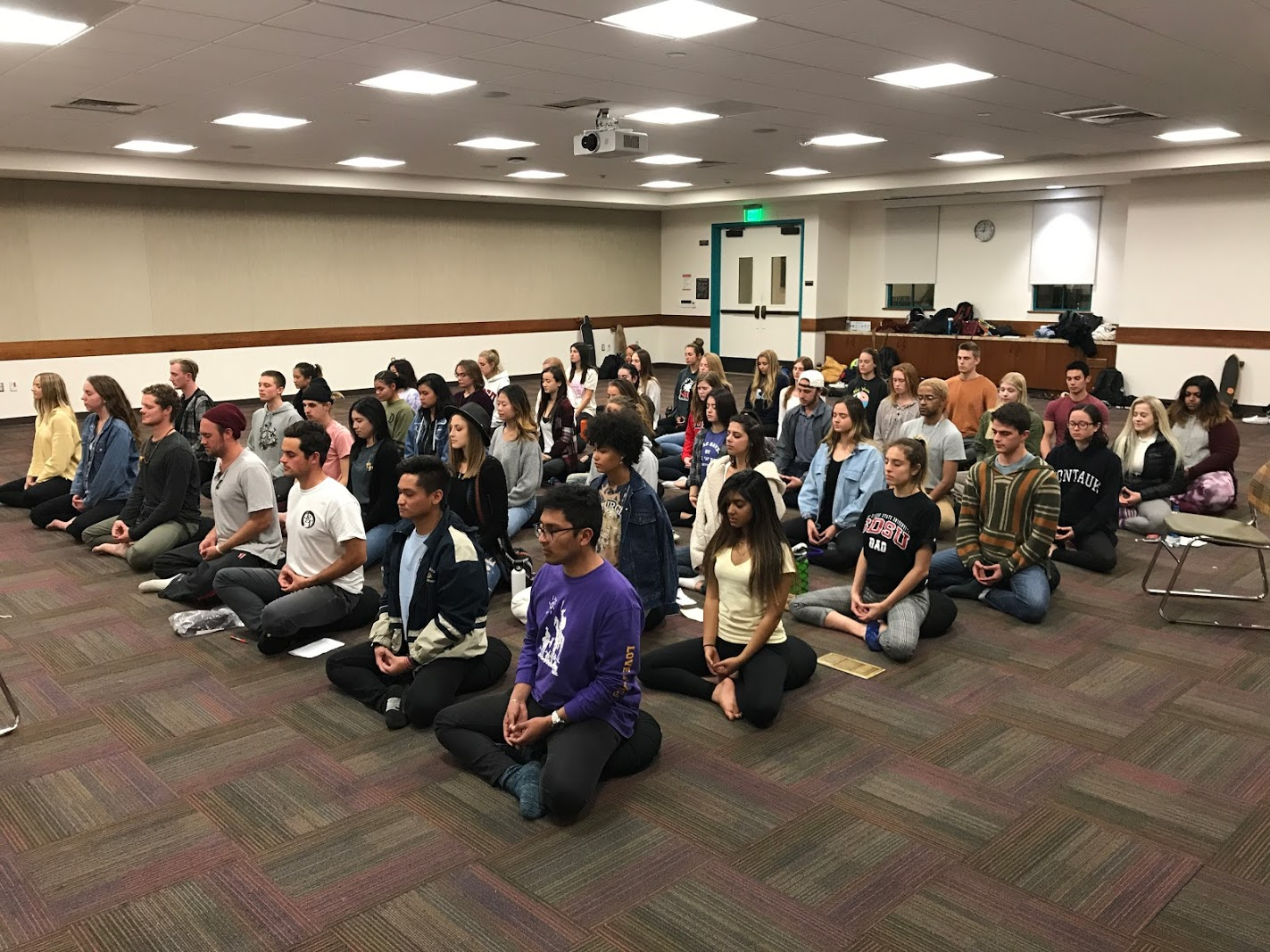
SDSU Delta Beta Tau Pledge Class 2018 sitting in meditation

In 2015, Dharma Bum Temple started to organize a Buddhist college fraternity at the suggestion of its co-founder Jeffrey Zlotnik, who was in Beta Theta Pi in college. Although the temple originally planned on creating a fraternity and a sorority, it ended up organizing a single co-ed fraternity. The first chapter of the fraternity was founded at San Diego State University (SDSU), which the temple already had a strong presence on. The temple had already been running a meditation club on the campus called "The Aztec Dharma Bums".

Delta Beta Tau (ΔΒΤ) was founded in September 2015 at SDSU as the first Buddhist college fraternity in the United States, its name was based on the initials of Dharma Bum Temple. The co-ed fraternity was founded on the principles of the Six Paramitas of Mahayana Buddhism. Rules and activities for the fraternity are based on Buddhist principles and to join pledges do community service and attend meditation retreats. In 2017, the fraternity announced plans to start a chapter at University of California, San Diego (UCSD).

As of August 20, 2019 the fraternity has initiated 223 active members at its founding chapter at SDSU.

== See also ==
- Buddhism in the United States
- Fo Guang Shan
