= Delta Beta Tau =

Buddhist college fraternity

- ΔΒΤ
- Founded: September 9, 2015; 10 years ago San Diego State University
- Type: Service
- Affiliation: Independent
- Status: Active
- Emphasis: Buddhism
- Scope: Local
- Motto: "For the Benefit of Others"
- Colors: Red Black
- Chapters: 1
- Members: 424 lifetime
- Headquarters: San Diego State University; San Diego, California 92115; United States
- Website: www.deltabetatau.org

Delta Beta Tau (ΔΒΤ) is an American co-ed Buddhist college fraternity founded at San Diego State University (SDSU). The fraternity was founded on September 9, 2015 by ten SDSU students as the first Buddhist college fraternity in the United States. Although the fraternity was founded on Buddhist principles, the fraternity accepts people of any religious background and also accepts members who are already members of other college fraternities. The fraternity is run almost entirely on voluntary donations and has a membership due for pledges of just one dollar per semester.

As of August 20, 2019 the fraternity has initiated 223 active members at its founding chapter at SDSU.

== History ==
The fraternity was founded and organized by Dharma Bum Temple, an American Buddhist temple near SDSU for which the fraternity based the letters of its name off of. The co-founder of the temple, Jeffrey Zlotnik, was in Beta Theta Pi in college and suggested creating a Buddhist fraternity as a way to find a way to instill college students with Buddhist principles that would follow them throughout college and for the rest of their lives. Dharma Bum Temple chose SDSU to build the first chapter of the fraternity because it already had a strong presence on the campus from running an SDSU meditation club called "The Aztec Dharma Bums".

There was originally plans to create one Buddhist fraternity and one Buddhist sorority, but it was eventually decided to create one co-ed fraternity.

In 2017, the fraternity announced plans to start another chapter at University of California, San Diego as well.

== Symbols ==
The fraternity's motto is "For the Benefit of Others". Its colors are red and black.

== Principles ==
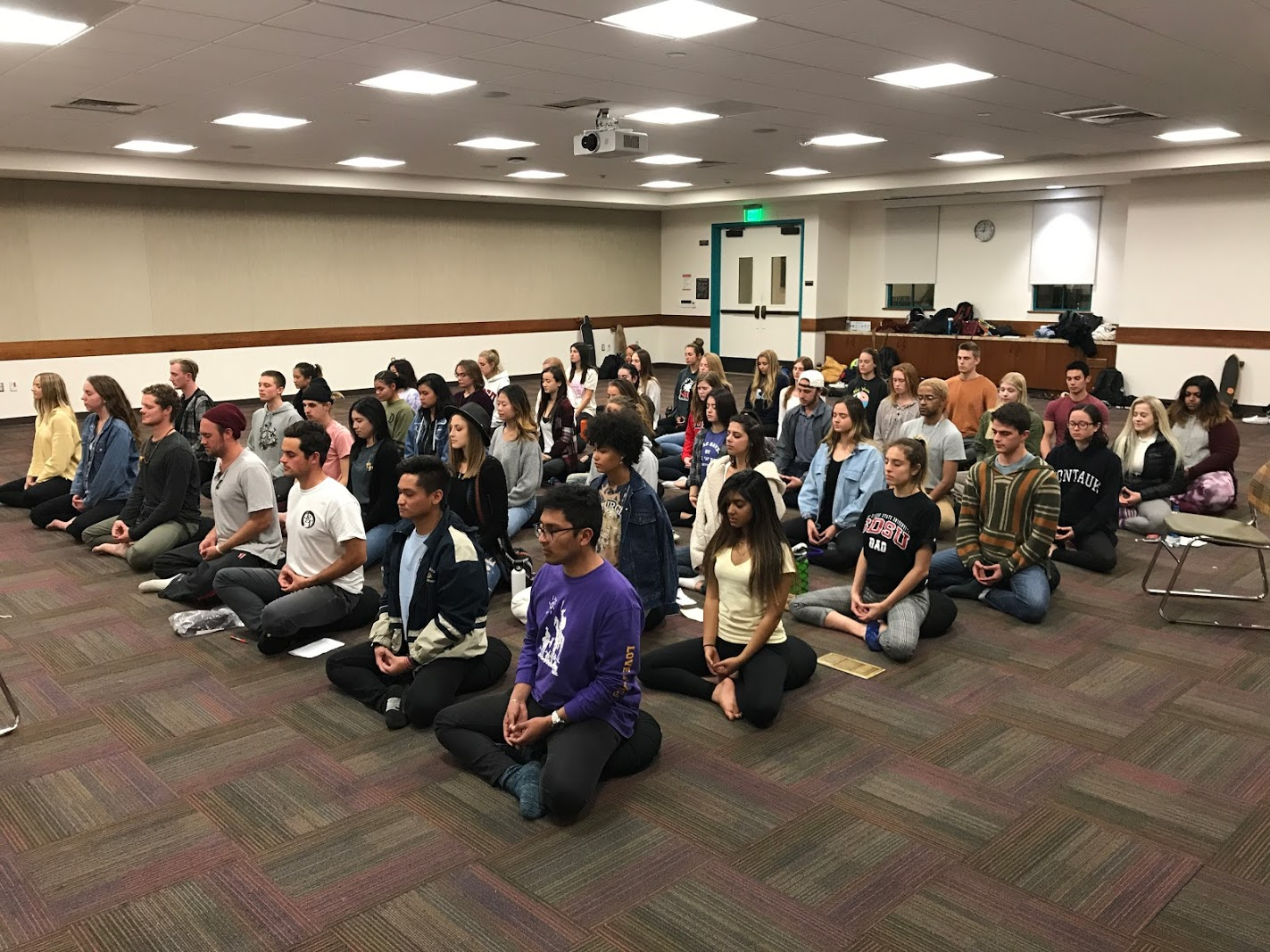
Delta Beta Tau Pledge Class 2018 in meditation

The co-ed fraternity takes the Six Paramitas of Mahayana Buddhism as the founding principles of the fraternity. The rules for the fraternity are based on Buddhist principles and to join pledges do community service and attend meditation retreats. Activities the fraternity offers include meditation retreats, guest speakers and community service events, with social gatherings incorporating mindfulness into them.

As of January 2018, there are no official Greek houses for Delta Beta Tau members to live together in, instead meetings are held at locations near the campuses until Greek housing for the fraternity can be established. Once Greek housing is set up, the fraternity plans on having house rules based on Buddhist principles and for the fraternity to hold normal Greek events such as formals and dating dashes, but with Buddhist values and mindfulness elements incorporated.

== Service ==
Delta Beta Tau's service programs are largely entwined with the outreach programs of Dharma Bum Temple, the temple that helped organize the founding of the fraternity. The fraternity focuses on community service, taking the principles of Buddhism as the basis for its values. Fraternity members are trained in guiding meditation so they can teach meditation to the community as a form of community service. Other outreach programs the fraternity hosts include volunteer work at local animal shelters, as well as participating in the existing prison outreach and homeless feeding programs that are hosted by Dharma Bum Temple.

== Gallery ==
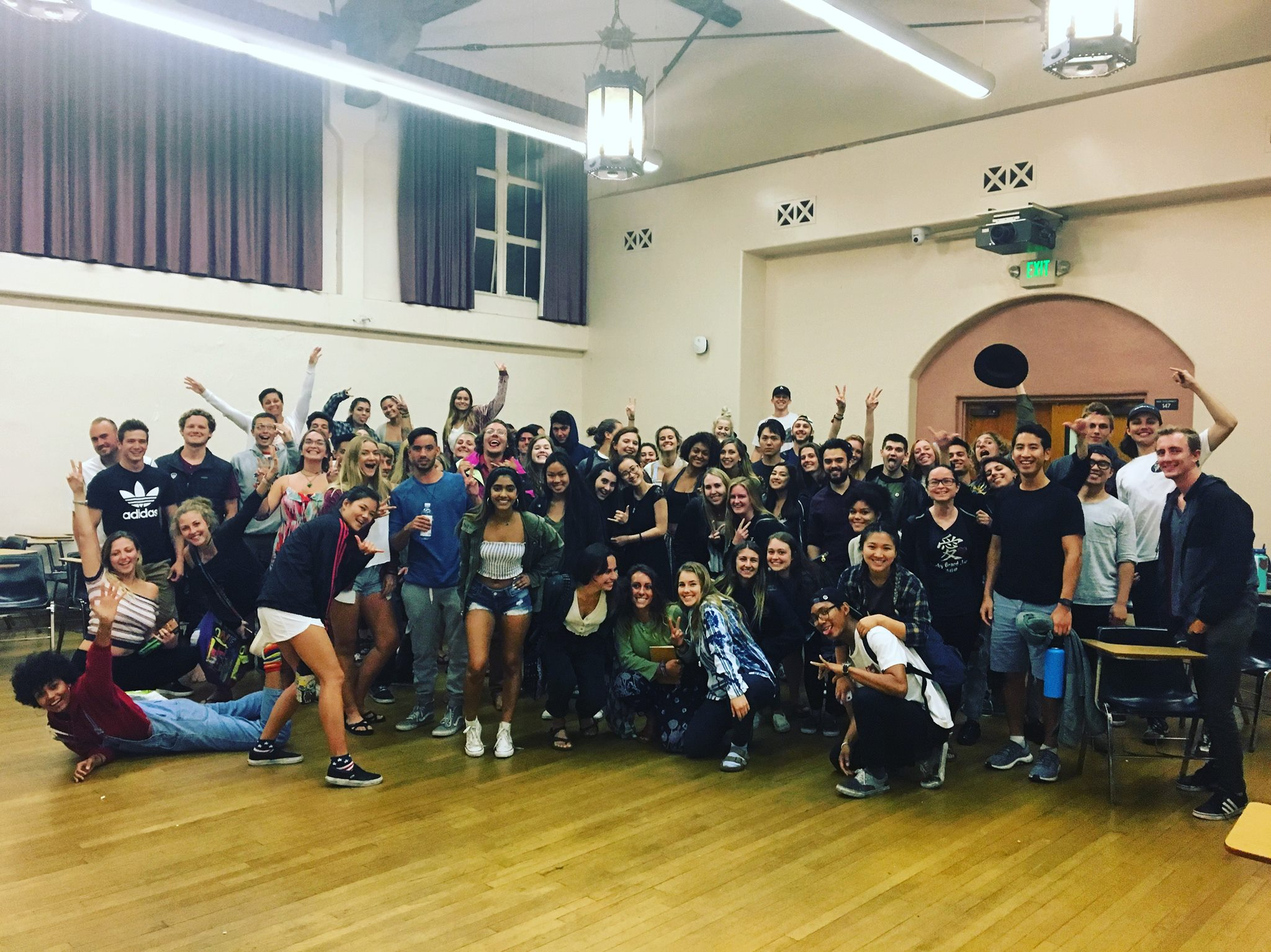
Delta Beta Tau Meeting

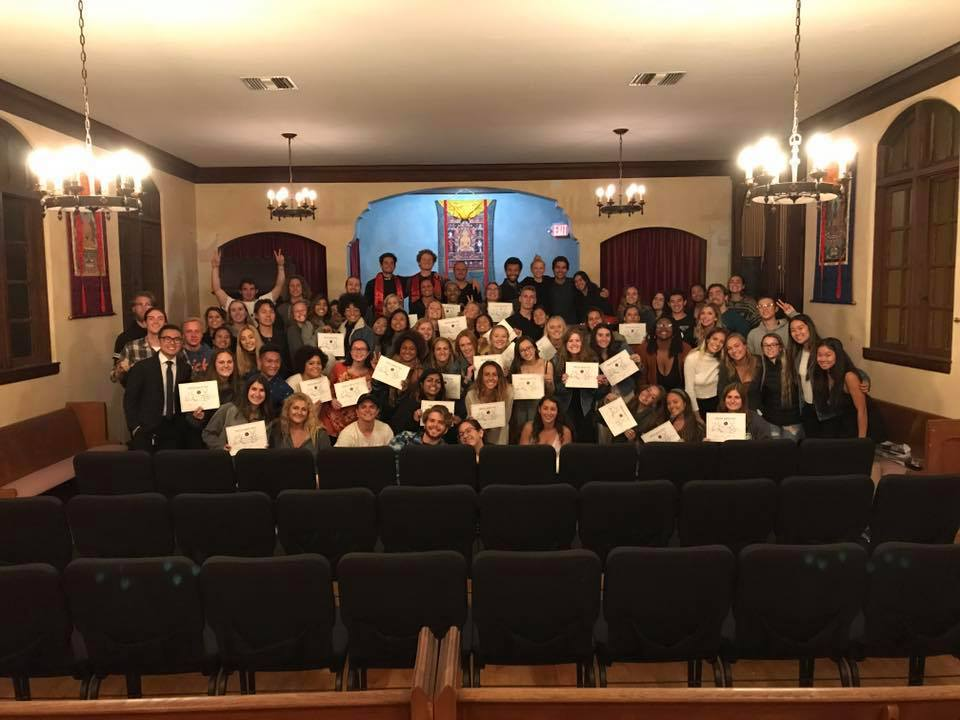
Delta Beta Tau Initiation 2018 held at the main hall of Dharma Bum Temple

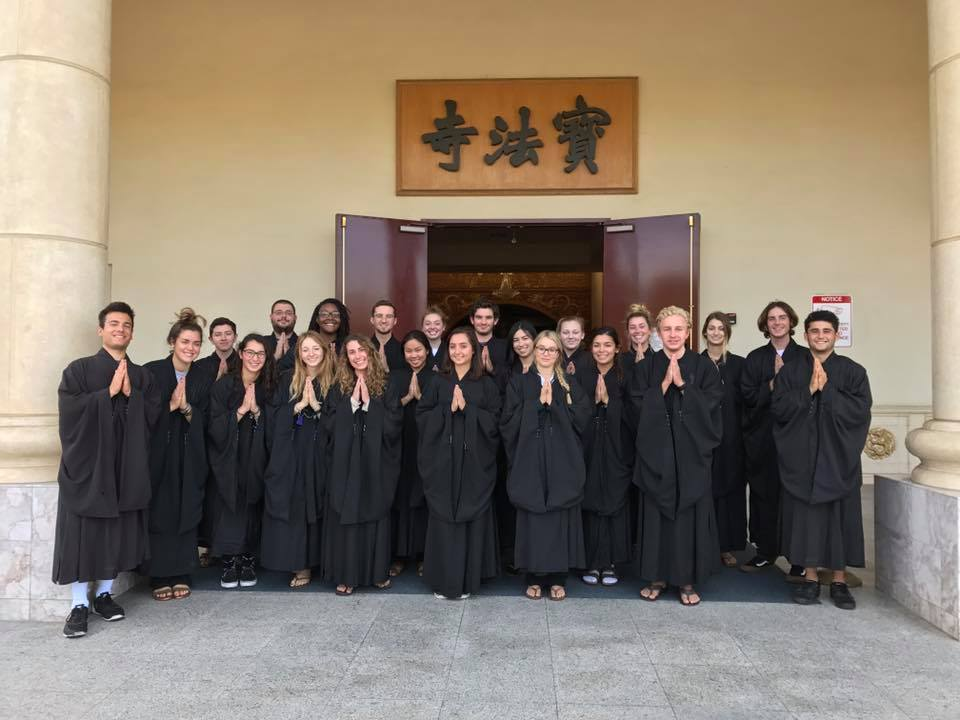
Delta Beta Tau at a retreat at Pao Fa Temple in Irvine.

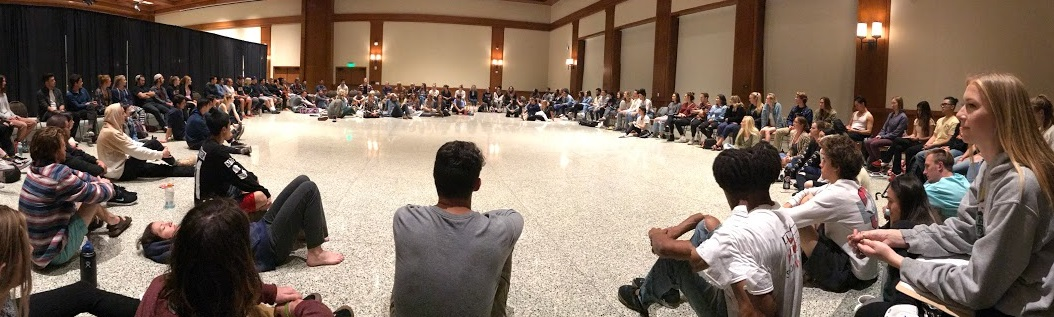
Group meditation during Delta Beta Tau meeting

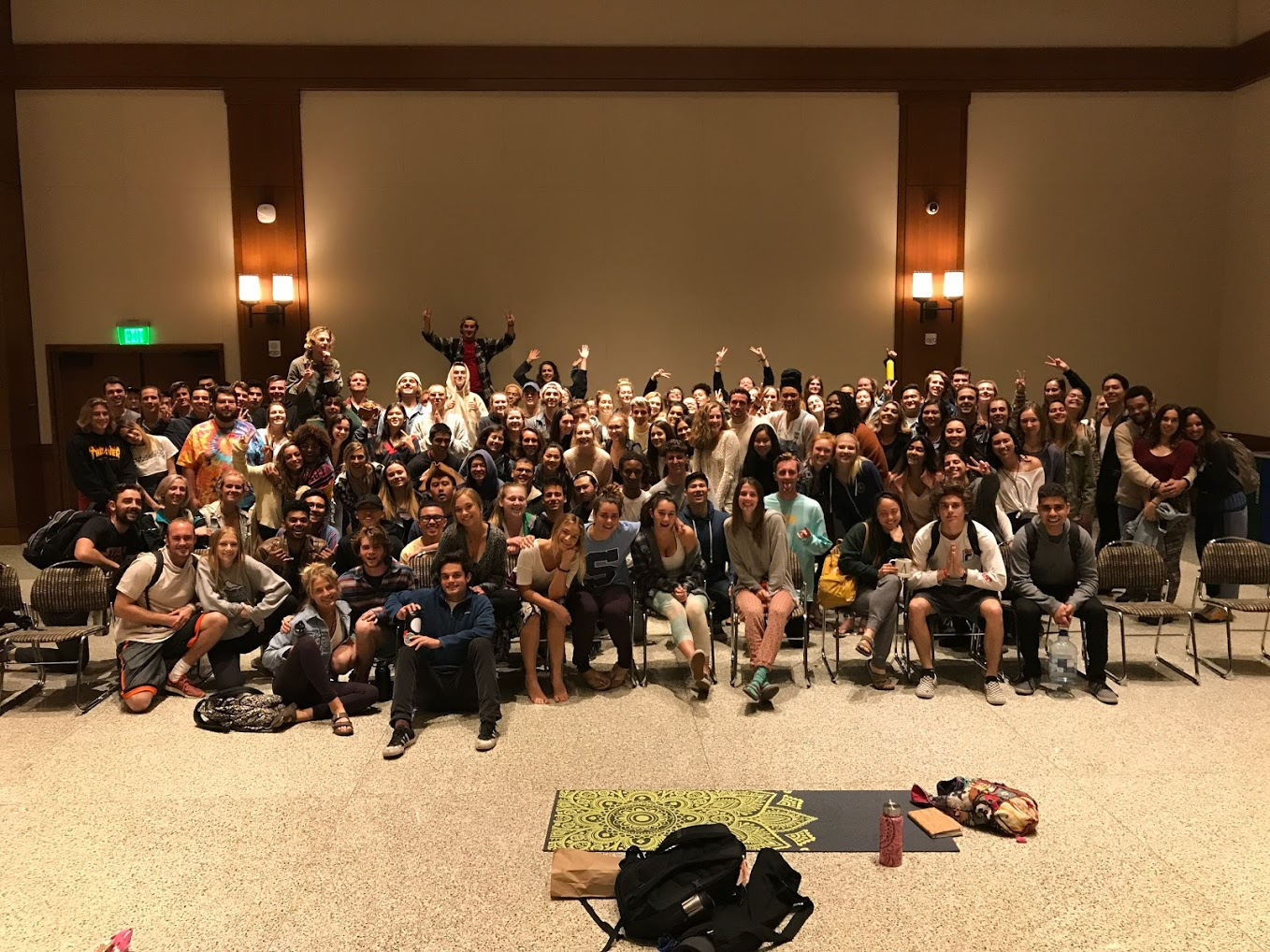
Delta Beta Tau meeting at SDSU

== See also ==
- Buddhism in the United States
- Dharma Bum Temple
- Cultural interest fraternities and sororities
