= Sangha Theravada Indonesia =

Saṅgha Theravāda Indonesia (STI) is a Theravada sangha (Buddhist monastic) organization in Indonesia, established on October 23, 1976, at Mahā Dhammaloka Vihāra (now Tanah Putih Vihāra) in Semarang. Saṅgha Theravāda Indonesia was formed by monks in the Dhammayuttika Nikāya ordination lineage who were not members of the existing sangha organization in Indonesia at the time (Sangha Agung Indonesia), namely Bhikkhu Aggabalo, Bhikkhu Khemasaraṇo, Bhikkhu Sudhammo, Bhikkhu Khemiyo, and Bhikkhu Ñāṇavutto. Based on the Saṅgha Theravāda Indonesia Charter, this organization was established as a sovereign and independent institutional umbrella specifically for Theravada monks who are Indonesian citizens.

== History ==
=== Dhammadūta mission from Thailand ===
Long before STI was officially established, efforts to revive Buddhism in Indonesia were pioneered through a visit by Ven. Somdet Phra Ñāṇasaṁvara (President of the Educational Council of Mahamakut Buddhist University in Thailand) in May 1968. During this visit, he met with Ven. Ashin Jinarakkhita, which led to the initiative of sending Dhammadūta monks from Thailand to train and help spur the progress of Buddhism in the country. The first Dhammadūta delegation, consisting of four monks, arrived and began their duties in Indonesia on July 25, 1969. A historic momentum occurred in 1970 when Ven. Somdet Phra Ñāṇasaṁvara directly conferred ordinations to Indonesian nationals at Borobudur, marking one of the starting points for the establishment of the Theravada sangha in Indonesia.

=== Dynamics of the laity and young monks ===
Until the mid-1970s, many Buddhist organizations desired direct guidance from the sangha for sermons, the ordination of paṇḍitas or upāsaka-upāsikā, and marriage blessings. At the same time, to continue the mission from Thailand, Ven. Somdet Phra Ñāṇasaṁvara dispatched additional monks, one of whom was Bhante Sombat Pavitto, who arrived in Jakarta on January 12, 1976. In the early days of their arrival, the Dhammadūta monks from Thailand did not yet have their own vihāra for a residence, so Bhante Sombat and the other monks temporarily stayed at a Mahayana vihāra (Sapta Ronggo Vihāra) as well as empty houses provided by the laity.

On the other hand, several young monks who had recently received upasampadā felt that the existing sangha organization in Indonesia at the time was less open and did not hold annual general meetings (mahāsamaya) regularly. Based on the needs of the laity and the demand to strictly adhere to the monastic Vinaya according to the Pāṭimokkha in the Tipiṭaka, a strong urge emerged to form a new sangha.

=== Declaration of establishment ===
On October 23, 1976, a historic meeting was held, attended by five Indonesian monks who had been ordained in the Dhammayuttika Nikāya lineage: Bhikkhu Aggabalo, Bhikkhu Khemasaraṇo, Bhikkhu Sudhammo, Bhikkhu Khemiyo, and Bhikkhu Ñāṇavutto. The meeting was also attended by lay figures, namely Drs. Suriyaputta K. S. Suratin, Drs. S. Mohtar Rashid, and Mrs. R. S. Prawirokoesoemo. Based on the rule in the Tipiṭaka that forming a sangha requires a minimum of four monks, the Saṅgha Theravāda Indonesia was established. Four of these monks were independent and not affiliated with any organization, while Bhikkhu Khemasaraṇo agreed and declared his departure from his previous sangha (Sangha Agung Indonesia) to join STI. This founding event was directly witnessed by the Thai Dhammadūta serving at the time, namely Bhante Suvirayan (Phra Dhamchetiyachan) and Bhante Sombat Pavitto (Phra Vidhurdhammabhorn).

=== Identity, initial leadership, and authorization ===
The STI organization logo, featuring a silhouette of the Borobudur stupa, was designed by Drs. Suriyaputta K. S. Suratin and directly approved by Bhikkhu Aggabalo; it continues to be used as the organization's identity to this day.

Organizationally, during its initial formation, the leadership of STI was intentionally handled by a Secretary-General (Mahā Lekkhanādhikārī) rather than a Chairman (Nāyaka). This was agreed upon to prevent friction with other organizations. Bhikkhu Aggabalo served as the first Secretary-General. Shortly after its establishment, Bhikkhu Aggabalo and Sāmaṇera Tejavanto (later Bhikkhu Paññāvaro) met with Bhante Girirakkhito Thera in Jakarta, who subsequently declared his integration into STI. The existence of STI was then officially recognized by the Government of Indonesia through a meeting with the Director General of Hindu and Buddhist Community Guidance at the time, Mr. Gde Puja, M.A., and his staff.

=== Independence and institutional sovereignty ===
As a sovereign entity, Saṅgha Theravāda Indonesia has its foundation stated in the Saṅgha Theravāda Indonesia Charter. The supreme sovereignty of the organization lies entirely in the hands of the Grand Assembly (Mahāsaṅghasabhā) of STI's internal monks, without any administrative subordination or direct hierarchical chain of command from any sangha authority abroad.

== Organizational development ==
Since its establishment in 1976, STI has routinely held grand assemblies and organizational restructuring. To facilitate administration, the organization implemented a Grand Assembly (Mahā Saṅgha Sabhā) system and divided service areas into regional coordinators (Padesa Nāyaka).

- 1970s period: The administration expanded following the upasampadā of Bhikkhu Paññāvaro and Bhikkhu Subalaratano in Bangkok (1977). A year later, Bhikkhu Paññāvaro was appointed as Deputy Secretary-General. In 1979, Bhikkhu Girirakkhito Thera officially became a member of STI.
- 1980s period: The baton of the Secretary-General passed from Bhikkhu Aggabalo to Bhikkhu Paññāvaro in 1980. During this decade, STI also successfully realized the construction of its first ordination facility (sīmā or uposathāgāra) through the establishment of Jakarta Dhammacakka Jaya Vihāra (VJDJ) in Sunter Agung, Tanjung Priok, North Jakarta. The construction of this specific Theravada vihāra was initially prompted by the concerns of Bhante Sombat Pavitto and his colleague Phra Khru Pallad Viriyacarya, who struggled to find suitable residential land capable of molding monks from the nation's youth. This grand vision was then assisted by Bhikkhu Paññāvaro as the Secretary-General of STI. The nearly one-hectare vihāra land was finally acquired thanks to the support and in-principle permission grant from businessman Anton Haliman (PT Agung Podomoro). Inaugurated on August 24, 1985, VJDJ later became the mother temple and home base for the monks of Saṅgha Theravāda Indonesia. Organizationally, STI's leadership continued to develop. On November 19, 1988, through the III Assembly at Mendut Vihāra, Magelang, the Sangha Executive Board (Kāraka Saṅgha Sabhā) was formed, with the position of Advisor (Saṅgha Anusāsanācariya) held by Bhikkhu Girirakkhito Mahāthera and General Chairman (Saṅghanāyaka) held by Sri Paññāvaro Mahāthera. This organizational terminology was further refined during the 1989 Assembly in Singaraja, changing Anu Saṅghanāyaka to Upa Saṅghanāyaka (Deputy General Chairman).
- 1990s period: Strategic positions continued to be refreshed through a series of Grand Assemblies throughout the early 1990s, elevating figures like Cittasanto Thera (1992) and Thitaketuko Thera (1994). The organization's rapid dynamics culminated in the 1999 Grand Assembly in Cianjur, which formulated a massive restructuring plan for the STI institution that took effect starting in the new millennium.
- 2000s period and beyond: Entering the new millennium, the Grand Assembly in Blitar in June 2000 inaugurated the Council of Elders (Thera Samāgama), headed by Sri Paññāvaro Mahāthera. The 2006 Grand Assembly in Singaraja then established a more solid administrative structure. As a form of respect for the founding monks and key figures, STI awarded the Title of Honor Ādisāsana Visārada to Mr. Cornelis Wowor (formerly Bhikkhu Aggabalo) in 2012, and built candis to house the ashes of Bhikkhu Khemasaraṇo Mahāthera in Juana and Bhikkhu Sudhammo Mahāthera in Lasem.

In its journey to date, STI has housed dozens of monks dedicated to propagating the Dhamma throughout the archipelago. Throughout its history, many monks have passed away within the sangha or returned to lay life, but there is no record of any monk leaving STI to join another sangha organization.

== Activities and tradition preservation ==
Saṅgha Theravāda Indonesia actively organizes spiritual guidance and Dhamma preservation activities for Buddhists across Indonesia. One of the national and international scale events routinely held is the chanting of the holy scriptures called the Indonesia Tipiṭaka Chanting (ITC), organized in conjunction with the grand commemoration of Āsāḷha Mahāpūjā.

On July 24-26, 2026, coinciding with the momentum of the Golden Jubilee (Half a Century/50 Years) anniversary of the establishment of Saṅgha Theravāda Indonesia, STI collaborated with the Theravada Buddhist Family of Indonesia (KBTI)—comprising Saṅgha Theravāda Indonesia (STI), the Theravada Buddhist Council of Indonesia (Magabudhi), Theravada Youth of Indonesia (Patria), and Theravada Aṭṭhasīlanī of Indonesia (Astinda)—to organize the ITC and Āsāḷha Mahāpūjā 2570 B.E. at Lumbini Park, in the Borobudur temple area, Magelang. This large-scale event was attended by more than 2,000 participants, including monks, sāmaṇeras, aṭṭhasīlanīs, and upāsaka-upāsikā from various regions in Indonesia and abroad, such as Singapore and Australia. During this year's implementation, the participants chanted 10 suttas from the Majjhimanikāya, led by the Committee Chairman, Bhante Guttadhammo Mahāthera. This activity is not only intended to preserve the Dhamma tradition but also as an effort to create an inner monument that cultivates self-control, loving-kindness, strengthens national character, and voices the vibration of peace amidst society.

== Disagreements ==
=== Walubi conflict ===
In the late 1990s, a prolonged crisis occurred within the Perwakilan Umat Buddha Indonesia (Walubi, Representatives of the Indonesian Buddhist Community) involving the Saṅgha Agung Indonesia (Sagin), the Majelis Buddhayana Indonesia (MBI), and Walubi itself. On August 20, 1998, the National Consensus of Indonesian Buddhists was signed, establishing the Perwakilan Umat Buddha Indonesia (New Walubi) as a federation, replacing the Perwalian Umat Buddha Indonesia (Old Walubi, Trusteeship of the Indonesian Buddhist Community). The formation of the New Walubi was subsequently followed by the dissolution of the Old Walubi on November 6, 1998, through a Special National Conference.

During this transition process, Sagin was expelled from the Old Walubi, meaning the New Walubi was left with only two sanghas, namely the Saṅgha Theravāda Indonesia (STI) and the Sangha Mahayana Indonesia (SMI). However, shortly after the Old Walubi was dissolved, STI and SMI argued that there was no longer an organization binding them. Therefore, together with Sagin, they held a meeting and formed the Supreme Sangha Conference of Indonesia / Konferensi Agung Sangha Indonesia (KASI). This conflict subsequently expanded and culminated in STI's departure from Walubi.

=== Bhikkhunī ordination ===
The resurgence of the bhikkhunī (nun) community in Indonesia in the late 1990s and early 2000s sparked differing views among traditional Buddhist authorities, including Saṅgha Theravāda Indonesia. On June 10, 2001, the Executive Board of Saṅgha Theravāda Indonesia, together with the central boards of the Theravada Buddhist Council of Indonesia (Magabudhi), Theravada Women of Indonesia (Wandani), and Theravada Youth of Indonesia (Patria), released a Joint Agreement document. Through the document, they stated that the practice of religious life as a bhikkhunī within the Vinaya of the Theravāda school no longer exists today. As a consequence of this view, the Indonesian Anagārinī Institution (LAI) was officially expelled and no longer recognized as a member of the Theravada Buddhist organizational family under their umbrella.

This stance refers to several historical decrees and views of foreign authorities. One of them is the announcement from the Thai Saṅgharāja, Kromluang Jinavarasirivat, on June 18, 1928, which forbade monks from giving ordination (pabbajjā) to women to become sāmaṇerīs (novice nuns), sikkhamānās, or bhikkhunīs, assuming that the lineage of bhikkhunīs as legitimate pavattinī (female preceptors) had long been broken. In addition, the Kotte Sri Kalyani Samagri Dharma Mahā Saṅgha Sabha authority in Sri Lanka, through a letter dated August 24, 2000, also emphasized to STI that they did not grant permission nor recognize the establishment of a bhikkhunī sangha in their country because it was deemed inconsistent with conventional Theravāda tradition.

=== Statues worship ===
The tradition of worshipping statues of the Four-Faced Brahma (often popularly known as the "Four-Faced Buddha" or Sie Mien Fuo) and Kwan Im (Bodhisattva Avalokiteśvara) among some Buddhists in Indonesia has sparked a distinct controversy, as it is considered an adoption of influences from outside the early Theravāda tradition.

According to a study by Ven. Bhikkhu Dhammadhiro, a prominent monk in the Saṅgha Theravāda Indonesia, the concept of Brahma in Buddhism possesses fundamental differences from the tradition of Brahmanism (Hinduism):

- Brahma in Buddhism is not viewed as the creator of the universe, nor as an eternal being, nor as the determiner of fate or the bestower of blessings for other beings.
- Brahma refers to beings born in the Brahma realm (free from sensual desires or rūpārūpabhava) as a result of having developed mental attainments at the level of rūpajhāna and arūpajhāna, whose lifespans remain bound by time.
- A brahma deity in the Buddhist tradition is depicted as personal, single-faced, genderless, and lacking a consort goddess (Sanskrit: shakti). This is vastly different from the Brahmanical concept which depicts Brahma as having four faces (initially five faces before being severed by the deity Shiva) and accompanied by the goddess Saraswati.

Furthermore, the popularity of worshipping the Four-Faced Brahma statue in Southeast Asia was heavily influenced by the erection of a statue at the Erawan Shrine, Bangkok, about 60 years ago. The construction of the statue was originally intended to ward off misfortune, but was colored by historical inconsistency because Erawan is the elephant mount of the deity Indra, whereas the statue built was of the deity Brahma whose mount is a swan. Sensational stories regarding the granting of worldly wishes at the site then spread widely through tour guides who simplified the designation to Sie Mien Fuo (Four-Faced Buddha) to attract the attention of tourists.

A similar shift in the meaning of worship objects also occurred with the statue of Kwan Im (Avalokiteśvara). Ven. Bhikkhu Dhammadhiro highlighted that the figure of Bodhisattva Avalokiteśvara is not found in early Buddhist literature, and its existence only originated from the Âcariyavâda tradition (referring to Northern Buddhism or Mahayana) hundreds of years after the Buddha passed away. Additionally, originally in India, Avalokiteśvara was depicted as male, but after spreading to China, the representation underwent a transformation into a maternal female figure often depicted riding a dragon.

Therefore, STI expressed its concern over the unquestioning acceptance of foreign worship figures within the Buddhist environment. The adoption of worship objects accompanied by the concepts of a creator, bestower of blessings, or mere markers of fate, according to Dhammadhiro, is feared to trigger doctrinal confusion and obscure the pure tradition of Buddhism if not approached with right understanding.
