= Ajahn Lee Dhammadharo =

Buddhist monk of Thai Forest Tradition (1907–1961)

Phra Suddhidhammaransi Gambhiramedhacarya (Lee Dhammadharo)

Personal life
- Born: 1907 Ubon Ratchathani
- Died: 1961 (aged 53–54)
- Occupation: bhikkhu

Religious life
- Religion: Buddhism
- School: Dhammayuttika Nikaya order of Theravada Buddhism
- Lineage: Thai Forest Tradition
- Dharma name: Dhammadharo

Senior posting
- Teacher: Mun Bhuridatta
- Students: Fuang Jotiko

Phra Suddhidhammaransi Gambhiramedhacarya (Thai:พระสุทธิธรรมรังสี คัมภีรเมธาจารย์; January 31, 1907 – April 26, 1961), commonly known as Ajahn Lee Dhammadharo (Thai: พระอาจารยย์ลี ธมฺมธโร), was a prominent meditation master of the Thai Forest Tradition in the Dhammayuttika Nikaya order of Theravāda Buddhism. He was a direct disciple of Ajahn Mun Bhuridatta Thera, and later became the founding abbot of Wat Asokaram.

Ajahn Lee is regarded as one of the most influential teachers of the Thai Forest Tradition in the 20th century. He is remembered for devising comprehensive meditation instructions and detailed expositions of the jhānas, as well as for bringing the practices of the Forest Tradition into the mainstream of Thai religious life. Though he never spoke of his attainments, his disciples widely believed he possessed advanced psychic powers.

== Biography ==
Ajahn Lee was born as Chalee Nareewong on January 31, 1907, in Yang Yo Phap Subdistrict, Muang Sam Sip District, Ubon Ratchathani Province, to Pao and Phuay Nareewong. He first attended school at the age of twelve, leaving at seventeen to work with his father. His youthful ambition was to earn money and marry at age thirty.

He was ordained on May 6, 1925. After two rains-retreats, he listened to a sermon by a disciple of Ajahn Mun and developed strong faith, eventually seeking out Ajahn Mun at Wat Burapha, Ubon Ratchathani. Ajahn Mun instructed him to use the meditation word Buddho. On May 27, 1927, Ajahn Lee formally re-ordained in the Dhammayuttika Nikaya at Wat Pathum Wanaram, Bangkok, with Phra Panyapisalthera (Nu Thitapanno) as preceptor and Ajahn Pheng of Wat Tai Phra Chao Yai Ong Tue as kammavācācariya. From then on, he strictly observed the dhutanga ascetic practices, including eating one meal a day and dwelling in forests.

Dissatisfied with lax monks around him who played games and ate at night, he chose the austere thudong wandering life. He accompanied Ajahn Mun on pilgrimage and travelled widely to Cambodia, Burma, and India.

Returning to his home village in 1927, he stayed in the cemetery, giving sermons and urging villagers to take refuge in the Triple Gem. His aim was to diminish spirit worship and reinforce Buddhist practice, which initially caused controversy but eventually drew support from local district officials.

Later, he established a monastery for white-robed nuns in Samut Prakan Province, which became Wat Asokaram, named in honour of Emperor Ashoka. He oversaw its construction, and it became a major centre for faith and meditation practice.

He fell seriously ill in late 1959 and died on April 26, 1961, aged 54, after 33 rains-retreats.

== Ecclesiastical Titles ==
- In 1956, Ajahn Lee was granted the rank of Phra Khru with the title Phra Suddhithammacharn.
- In 1957, he was elevated to the rank of Phra Ratchakhana, heading the Vipassanadhura division, with the title Phra Suddhidhammaransi Gambhiramedhacarya.

== Legacy ==
Ajahn Lee is remembered as one of the foremost disciples of Ajahn Mun, part of the "galaxy of great names" in the Thai Forest Tradition that included Ajahn Thate Desaransi, Luang Pu Khao, and Luang Pu Waen. His teachings continue to be studied, especially his systematic meditation manuals, which remain among the most detailed in the Forest Tradition. He is also well known as a famous amulet maker.

== Sources ==
- Cai, Zhi Yun (2014). Doctrinal Analysis of the Origin and Evolution of the Thai Kammatthana Tradition with a Special Reference to the Present Kammatthana Ajahns. University of the West.
- Dhammadharo, Ajahn Lee. The Autobiography of Phra Ajaan Lee (PDF). dhammatalks.org.
- Tiyavanich, Kamala (1997). Forest Recollections: Wandering Monks in Twentieth-Century Thailand. University of Hawaii Press. ISBN 978-0-8248-1781-7.
