= Ajaan Suwat Suvaco =

Thai Buddhist Monk (1919–2002)

Personal life
- Born: 27 August 1919
- Died: 5 April 2002 (aged 82) Buriram, Thailand

Religious life
- Religion: Buddhism
- Order: Dhammayuttika Nikaya
- School: Theravāda
- Lineage: Thai Forest Tradition

Ajaan Suwat Suvaco (27 August 1919 – 5 April 2002), born in Thailand, was a Buddhist monk who founded four monasteries in the western United States.
