= Dhammayuttika Nikaya =

Theravāda Buddhist monastic order

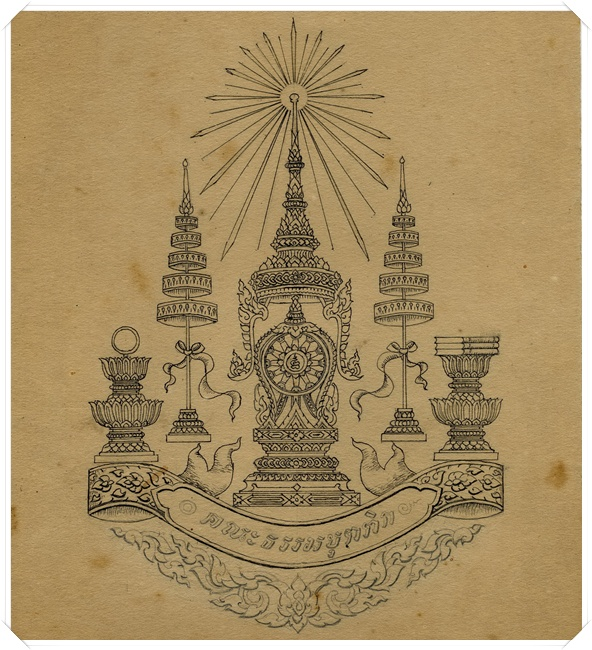
- Abbreviation: Dhammayut
- Formation: 1833
- Founder: Vajirañāṇo Bhikkhu (later King Mongkut)
- Type: Buddhist monastic order
- Headquarters: Wat Bowonniwet Vihara, Phra Nakhon District, Bangkok, Thailand
- Superior general: Somdet Phra Ariyavongsagatanana IX (Incumbent since 2017)

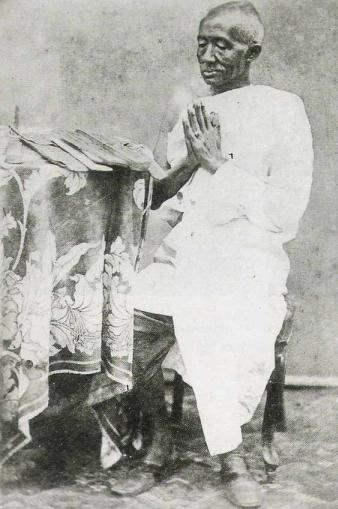
Vajirañāṇo Bhikkhu, later King Mongkut of the Rattanakosin Kingdom, founder of the Dhammayuttika Nikaya

Dhammayuttika Nikāya (Pali; Thai: ธรรมยุติกนิกาย; RTGS: Thammayuttika Nikai; Khmer: ធម្មយុត្តិកនិកាយ, Thommoyutteka Nikay), or Dhammayut Order (Thai: คณะธรรมยุต), is an order of Theravada Buddhist bhikkhus (monks) in Thailand, Cambodia, and Burma, with significant branches in the Western world. Its name is derived from Pali dhamma ("teachings of the Buddha") + yutti (in accordance with) + ka (group).

The order began in Thailand as a reform movement led by a prince who would later become King Mongkut of Siam, before also spreading to Cambodia and Burma. Initially, King Mongkut was frustrated because he could not find monks who understood the original teachings of the Buddha and truly adhered to the rules of the monks. This happened because of the syncretism of Buddhism with Thai folk religion. Consequently, King Mongkut emphasised the use of the Pali Canon as the primary authority for monastic practices, and sought to eliminate all of the syncretic elements. The movement became formally recognised as its own monastic order by the Thai government in 1902, with any Thai Theravada bhikkhus not within the order being referred to as part of the Maha Nikaya.

The Dhammayuttika Nikaya plays a significant political role in Thailand. The order has historically been favored by the Thai government and monarchy, with the order holding the majority of all royal monastic titles in Thailand and most of the Supreme Patriarchs (the head of the Thai monastic community) since its founding having come from the Dhammayuttika Nikaya, despite the order making up less than ten percent of all bhikkhus in Thailand.

== History ==
Dhammayuttika Nikaya (Thai: Thammayut) began in 1833 as a reform movement led by Mongkut (later King Rama IV), son of King Rama II of Siam. It remained a reform movement until passage of the Sangha Act of 1902, which formally recognised it as the lesser of Thailand's two Theravada denominations, the other being Maha Nikaya.

Prince Mongkut was a bhikkhu (religious name: Vajirañāṇo) for 27 years (1824–1851) before becoming King of Thailand (1851–1868). The then 20 year-old prince entered monastic life in 1824. Over the course of his early meditation training, Mongkut was frustrated that his teachers could not relate the meditation techniques they were teaching to the original teachings of the Buddha. Also, he described what he saw as serious discrepancies between the vinaya (monastic rules) and the actual practices of Thai bhikkhus. Mongkut, concerned that the ordination lines in Thailand were broken by a lack of adherence to this monastic code, sought out a different lineage of bhikkhus with practice that is more in line with the vinaya.

There are several rules in the Theravada monastic code by which a bhikkhu is "defeated" – he is no longer a bhikkhu even if he continues to wear robes and is treated as one. Every ordination ceremony in Theravada Buddhism is performed by ten bhikkhus to guard against the possibility of the ordination being rendered invalid by having a "defeated bhikkhu" as preceptor. Despite this, Mongkut was concerned that the area's lineages of regional traditions were broken. He made every effort to commission a phalanx of bhikkhus in Thailand with the highest probability of an unbroken lineage traceable back to the Buddha.

Mongkut eventually found a lineage among the Mon people in Thailand who had a stronger practice. He reordained in this group and began a reform movement that would become the Thammayut order. In founding the Thammayut order, Mongkut made an effort to remove all non-Buddhist, folk religious, and superstitious elements which over the years had become part of Thai Buddhism. He emphasised the use of the Pali Canon as the primary authority as the basis for monastic practices. Additionally, Thammayut bhikkhus are expected to eat only one meal a day (not two) and the meal was to be gathered during a traditional alms round.

Vajirañāṇavarorasa

In 1836, Mongkut became the first abbot of the new Wat Bowonniwet Vihara, and it would become the administrative center of the Thammayut order to the present day.

Soon after, Mongkut had other bhikkhus who were close to him reordain in this lineage of Mon bhikkhus. Among these were Mongkut's son Vajirañāṇavarorasa and Somdet Phra Wannarat "Thap", a grade nine Pali scholar.

According to anthropologist Jim Taylor, Vajirañāṇavarorasa's autobiography tells how "Thap had differences with the somewhat more "worldly" bhikkhus at Wat Bowornniwet, which led to dissension and the movement's eventual division into four primary competing factions (monastic lines or "stems")." In the mid-19th century these branches became so estranged that each one developed its own style of chanting, interpretation, and translation of Pali texts, and differed on issues related to the monastic code.

It was not until Vajirañāṇavarorasa took control of a new phase of Sangha reforms in 1892 that the administrative Thammayut hierarchy would begin to form a cohesive vision. Officially Pusso Saa was the Sangharaja; however, he was only a figurehead. Thanissaro, a Thai-ordained forest bhikkhu, notes though that in the early-20th century, Ajahn Mun's kammaṭṭhāna lineage formed a distinct camp within the Thammayut order which was at odds with Vajirañāṇavarorasa's reforms.

== Political role in Thailand ==
While the Dhammayuttika Nikaya originally started as a Buddhist reform movement in Thailand, later leading to the development of the Thai forest tradition, the order has played a significant political role in Thailand as well.

Since its origins, the Dhammayuttika Nikaya has historically been the preferred choice of the Thai government and the monarchy. Having been started by a Thai prince, the order has always had close ties to the monarchy and has historically played a key role in ensuring public support for the palace. Journalist Paul Handley writes that:

Although the doctrinal differences between the schools had become less significant, putting Thammayut [sic] on top ensured that the sangha remained closely allied with the palace.

This favoritism by Thai elites for the Dhammayuttika order is most apparent in the proportion of monastic titles given to senior bhikkhus. While taking up only about six percent of the bhikkhus in Thailand, over half of Thailand's monastic titles and privileges have gone to Dhammayuttika bhikkhus, and nine of the past thirteen Supreme Patriarchs of Thailand have belonged to the Dhammayuttika order.

The preference by the Thai government and palace for Dhammayuttika has even led to the persecution of some high ranking Maha Nikaya bhikkhus who were seen as a threat to the Dhammayuttika hierarchy or the Thai government. The most famous case was the case of Phra Phimontham, a high ranking Maha Nikaya bhikkhu known for his pro-democracy views and opposition to Dhammayuttika elitism, who was likely to become the next Supreme Patriarch of Thailand at the time. In 1962, Phra Phimontham was imprisoned and defrocked by Thailand's then military junta and widely defamed in the Thai media over several criminal charges. The scandal allowed the military junta to pass a Sangha reform act that further centralised the Thai Sangha's administration under Dhammayuttika control. Following a change in government, the various criminal charges against Phra Phimontham were later determined to have been false all along. In reality, the military junta persecuted Phra Phimontham for his political views and disseminated the false charges in the media in order to arrest him and limit his influence, and to consolidate its power over the Sangha.

More recently, news analysts have described the actions of the 2014 military junta against Wat Phra Dhammakaya and Wat Paknam Bhasichareon as also being about the politics of these two Nikayas. From 2013-2017 the bhikkhu who was next in line for Supreme Patriarch was the Maha Nikaya bhikkhu Somdet Chuang Varapuñño of Wat Paknam Bhasicheroen. (Note: Prior to the change in the law in December 2016, the supreme patriarch was chosen from whoever was the most senior member of the Sangha Supreme Council, who, at the time, was Somdet Chuang.) However, lawsuits involving Somdet Chuang and the affiliated Wat Phra Dhammakaya caused his appointment to be postponed and eventually withdrawn, with another candidate from the Dhammayuttika fraternity appointed instead. The lawsuits against Wat Phra Dhammakaya and Somdet Chuang were, in fact, eventually used as reasons by the junta to withdraw his nomination. Wat Paknam was later cleared of all charges two days after Somdet Chuang's nomination was officially withdrawn.

On 7 February 2017, Prime Minister Prayut Chan-o-cha confirmed the appointment of Somdet Phra Maha Muniwong as the 20th Supreme Patriarch of Thailand in a televised address. He was the abbott of Wat Ratchabophit and a leading member of the Dhammayuttika Nikaya order. The prime minister stated: "I submitted the names of five qualified monks for His Majesty to consider. On Monday night, I was informed His Majesty chose Somdet Phra Maha Muniwong."

During the 2017–18 Thai temple fraud investigations, Anthropologist Jim Taylor described the arrests made during the investigations as the "ruling palace regime" trying to consolidate traditional, central royalist power by eliminating several high-ranking Maha Nikaya bhikkhus and members of the Sangha Supreme Council. Taylor argues that this was done in order to ensure that the next Supreme Patriarch is also from the Dhammayuttika Nikaya, pointing to the junta's previous interference with the position in 2017 and that the suspects were all high-ranking non-royalist bhikkhus. In fact, in July 2018, the junta passed a law giving the Thai King the ability to select members of the Sangha Supreme Council instead of the monks. The alleged corruption within the Sangha from these investigations were cited as the reason for the change.

== In Cambodia ==
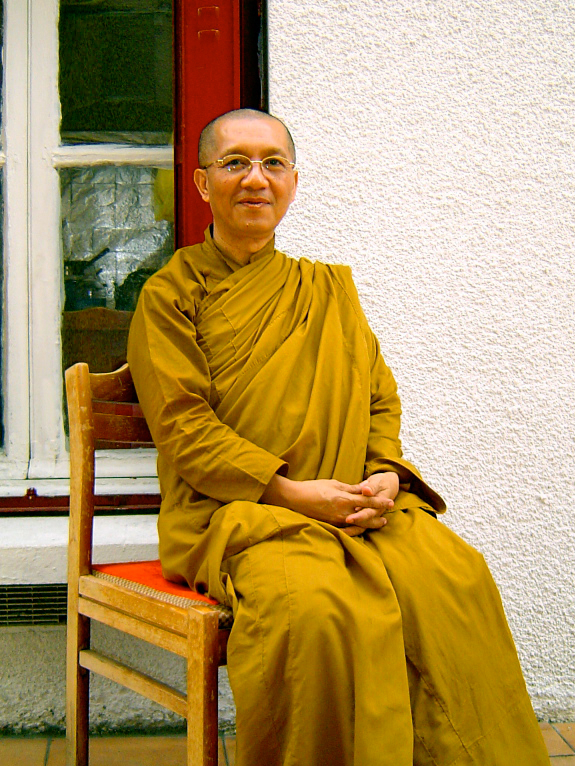
Samdech Preah Sanghareach Bour Kry, the current Supreme Patriarch of the Dhammayuttika Order of Cambodia

In 1855, King Norodom of Cambodia invited Preah Saukonn Pan, also referred to as Maha Pan, a Khmer bhikkhu educated in the Dhammayuttika Nikaya, to establish a branch of the Dhammayuttika order in Cambodia. Maha Pan became the first Sangharaja of the Dhammayuttika lineage, residing at Wat Botum, a new temple erected by the king specifically for Dhammayuttika bhikkhus. The Cambodian order benefited from royal patronage but was also sometimes regarded with suspicion due to its ties to the Thai monarchy.

The Dhammayuttika order in Cambodia suffered greatly under the Khmer Rouge, being particularly targeted because of its perceived ties to monarchy and a foreign nation, in addition to the Khmer Rouge's general repression of the Buddhist hierarchy in Cambodia. Between 1981 and 1991, the Dhammayuttika Nikaya was combined with the Cambodian Mohanikay in a unified Sangha system established under Vietnamese domination. In 1991, King Norodom Sihanouk returned from exile and appointed the first new Dhammayuttika Sangharaja in ten years, effectively ending the policy of official unification. The Dhammayuttika continues to exist in Cambodia, though its bhikkhus constitute a very small minority. On issues such as the role of bhikkhu in HIV/AIDS treatment and education, the current Sangharaja, Bour Kry has adopted a more liberal position than the Mohanikay head Tep Vong, but is less radical than that of certain Engaged Buddhist elements of the Mohanikay order.

== In Myanmar ==
The "Dhammayutti Nikāya Mahāyin Gaing" (Burmese: ဓမ္မယုတ္တိနိကာယမဟာရင်ဂိုဏ်း) or simply the "Mahayin Gaing" (Burmese: မဟာရင်ဂိုဏ်း), in Myanmar has its origins as "a late nineteenth-century Mon reform tradition [that] traces its lineage to the Thai Thammayut [sic] order." It is one of the nine legally sanctioned monastic orders in Myanmar, under the 1990 Law Concerning Sangha Organizations.

Mahayin monks by origin, 2016
1. Mon 633 (76.9%)
2. Kayin 112 (13.6%)
3. Yangon 75 (9.11%)
4. Bago 3 (0.36%)

According to 2016 statistics published by the State Samgha Maha Nayaka Committee, 823 monks belonged to this monastic order, representing 0.15% of all monks in the country, making it the second smallest legally-sanctioned monastic order. With respect to geographic representation, the majority of Mahayin monks are based in Mon State (76.91%), followed by neighboring Kayin State (13.61%). In 2016, the order had 79 monasteries, mostly in Mon and Kayin States, representing 0.1% of the country's monasteries.

== In Indonesia ==
On October 23, 1976, Saṅgha Theravāda Indonesia (Indonesian Theravāda Saṅgha) was formed at the Mahā Dhammaloka Vihāra (now Tanah Putih Vihāra), Semarang, Central Java. The Indonesian Theravāda Saṅgha was formed by Indonesian monks who were not members of the Sangha that already existed in Indonesia at that time. The sangha organisation was founded by five Indonesian monks who came from the ordination line of the Thai Dhammayuttika, Bhikkhu Aggabalo, Bhikkhu Khemasarano, Bhikkhu Sudhammo, Bhikkhu Khemiyo, and Bhikkhu Ñaṇavutto. The historic event was also witnessed by two Thai Dhammadutas, namely Bhante Suvirayan (now Phra Dhamchetiyachan) and Bhante Sombat Pavitto (now Phra Vidhurdhammabhorn) who were ordained at Wat Bowonniwet, that is the center of the Dhammayuttika order.

In addition, there is also the Saṅgha Theravāda Dhammayut Indonesia that is headed directly by the Thai superiors of the Dhammayuttika ordination line.

== See also ==
- Nikāya
- Maha Nikaya
- Sangharaja
- Supreme Patriarch of Cambodia
- Supreme Patriarch of Thailand

== Bibliography ==
- Buswell, Robert; Lopez, Donald S. (2013), The Princeton Dictionary of Buddhism, Princeton University Press, ISBN 978-0-691-15786-3, archived from the original on 2016-12-27
- Harris, Ian (August 2001), "Sangha Groupings in Cambodia", Buddhist Studies Review, 18 (I): 65–72, doi:10.1558/bsrv.v18i1.14469, S2CID 247890925
- Keyes, Charles F. (1994), "Communist Revolution and the Buddhist Past in Cambodia", Asian Visions of Authority: Religion and the Modern States of East and Southeast Asia, Honolulu, HI: University of Hawaii Press, pp. 43–73
- Taylor, J. L. (1993), Forest Monks and the Nation-state: An Anthropological and Historical Study in Northeastern Thailand, Institute of Southeast Asian Studies, ISBN 978-981-3016-49-1, archived from the original on 2021-02-25
