= Louis Em =

Cambodian Buddhist monk

Louis Em សម្ដេចព្រះធម្មលិខិត ល្វី ឯម
- Title: Preah PhikhoThoemeakbal

Personal life
- Born: 1882 Phnom Penh, French Cambodia
- Died: 1957 (aged 75) Langka Temple, Phnom Penh, Cambodia

Religious life
- Religion: Buddhism
- School: Theravada
- Dharma name: Dhammapāla

Louis Em was an important modernist Buddhist monk who encouraged the 1942 Umbrella Revolution against the French protectorate of Cambodia, translated many major documents from Pali to Khmer. During the better part of the 20th century, he was considered "Phnom Penh's best educated monk," "very capable and extremely popular."

== Biography ==
=== Leading the reform of Pali studies in Cambodia ===
In 1918, Louis Em was recruited as a teacher for the Pali School founded by Louis Finot in 1914 "in order to get rid of the cultural suzerainty that Thailand retained over Cambodia, especially in the field of religious formation". Realizing the great need for a better understanding of the Buddhist doctrine in Cambodia, he endeavoured to translate the Pali canon into Khmer with the support of Prince Norodom Singhara of the Royal Palace, partnering with monks at Wat Botum and Wat Popei. For that purpose, in 1929, he was chosen to be the first president of the Tripitaka commission of Cambodia.

After Thong died on 2 August 1927, Louis Em was appointed as the new director of the Superior School of Pali founded in 1922 as an expansion of the School of Pali. This was significative of a change in the balance of power as he was not from the Thai-influenced and conservative Thammayut order but of the more modern and Khmer Maha Nikaya. His prestige was such that in June 1928, the King of Laos even sent Buddhist monks from Luang Prabang to come and study under his direction in Wat Langka.

In November 1931, in a grand ceremony at the Royal Palace, the first volume of this translation of the Tripitaka in Khmer was presented to Paul Reynaud, minister of the Colonies.

In 1934, Louis Em was decorated with the Légion d'honneur in recognition for his intellectual efforts to modernize Cambodia.

=== The nationalist line of Wat Langka ===
According to his biographer Yang Sophat, Louis Em turned Wat Langka into "one of the greatest battlefields of Cambodia". His nationalist leaning may explain the long vacancy of the seat for the Supreme Patriarch of Cambodia as he may have been blacklisted by the French protectorate of Cambodia. This independentist spirit of Wat Langka culminated in the national insurrection in 1942 known as the Umbrella Revolution. One of Louis Em's most notorious students was Khieu Chum whom he ordained in 1928 before the latter became the most powerful and explicit champion of the "Wat Langka line" of which blended Khmer nationalism with modernism.

After the revolution, out of solidarity with other alumni students such as Hem Chieu who was deported to Poulo Condor where he later died of bad treatments, Louis Em resigned from his position as Direction of the Higher School of Pali and President of the Commission of Pali Tripitaka translation. Meanwhile, Huot That and Chuon Nath kept there pro-French stance in public.

=== Giving Cambodia a seat in the World Fellowship of Buddhists ===
Louis Em's reputation as an expert in the field of Pali studies continued to grow. On 28 December 1952, Louis Em was made president of the Cambodian chapter of the World Fellowship of Buddhists during its first meeting at Wat Ounalom. His attitude resonated with the commitment of King Sihanouk in the wake of his "crusade for independence" as the monarch in his inaugural speech express his desire his colors "nailed to the mast of a modernized and engaged Buddhism." He was tireless until his last day in promoting academic research and publications in the field of Pali and Buddhist studies.

Louis Em died in 1957 and was given a national hommage during his funeral presided by Sisowath Monireth.

== Legacy: the pali master of Cambodia ==
In the 1930s, Lous Em undertook the translation of the Buddhist canonical collection of the Tripitaka from Pali to Khmer. His main ambition was to make a bilingual Pāli-Khmer side-by-side edition of the three "baskets" of the Buddhist canon. Since the inception of this Pali school by Venerable Thong, Louis Em developed a school which also counted eminent members such as Chuon Nath and Huot Tat. Louis Em contributed to the modernization of Buddhist scholarship in Cambodia as he promoted the printing of schoolbooks following western patterns of teaching. Ian Harris considers that Louis Em was part of the wave of the "Pali-text puritanism" which swept across Theravada Buddhism at the time in an effort to recover the true teachings of the Buddha and restore its canonical authenticity apart from the literary melange with traditional local practices. Along with the "modernist views of moral purification", Pali studies was part of a Buddhist Entmythologisierung to "demythologize the cosmic vision of [reincarnation] and bring it in line with human history." According to Louis Em, this knowledge would "move modern Cambodia forward, from darkness into light, as a torch for all beings in the world."

== Awards and recognitions ==
- Royal Order of Monisaraphon (1917)
- Legion d'honneur (1934)
- Royal Order of Cambodia
