= Pang Khat =

Khmer monk and linguist

Venerable Pang Khat also known as Bhikkhu Viriyapandito was a Cambodian Theravada bikkhu monk who was notorious from 1940 to 1975 and who is most famous for his translations from Sanskrit language to Khmer.

== Biography ==
=== A promising young Buddhist from Kampong Cham ===
Khat was born between 1910 in Phnom Del village, Srok Batheay in Kampong Cham province. His father was named Pang and his mother was named Ong. After graduating from high school, Pang Khat passed the exam to become a professor of French.

After being ordained as a monk, Pang Khat came to study in Phnom Penh, where he stayed at Wat Ounalom in the pavilion of Huot Tat who was also his teacher and master for the rest of his life. After graduating from the Pali School, Pang Khat became the first Pali language teacher at Wat Prang in Oudong District.

In 1938, Pang Khat was sent to Saigon to further his studies in archeology and sanskrit with the French School of the Far East.

=== Involvement in the Umbrella Revolution ===
As an independent, anti-monarchist, Pang Khat was involved in the circle of Son Ngoc Thanh and worked as a "recruiting agent" for the insurrection at the Buddhist Institute. In fact, "both Khieu Chum and Pang Khat were known to have had “close relations" with Thanh; they were probably part of a growing "nucleus" of his partisans among Phnom Penh's monks."

He was part of the Umbrella Revolution in 1942 which involved many other monks in an effort to oust the French protectorate. With many other monks such as Bunchan Mol and Pach Chhoeun, they were taken into custody. Pang Khat returned to Saigon, not as a student but as a prisoner at the Central Prison. While some of his co-detainees were sent to prison on the island of Poulo-Condore, he was liberated early. When his fellow prisoners finally returned to Cambodia in mid-March 1945, he went to the Vietnamese border to greet them.

While he and his circle had been associated with the Khmer Issarak, they definitely broke off with the communist ideology when in 1954 Son Ngoc Thanh founded the more right-wing Khmer Serei with support from the United States of America.

=== Unclear position in the confusion of the Cambodian Civil War ===
During the murky years of the Cambodian Civil War, Pang Khat tried to walk the tight line of patriotism and pacifism. he was particularly opposed to the politics of Sihanouk and considered that "Sihanouk's disposal as Head of State [...] was comparable to the requirement that a Buddhist leave the pagoda if he committed a crime or misdemeanor" adding that after making a pact with Communist China, "Sihanouk no longer is a Cambodian".

At the same time, he was very opposed to the communist influences coming from Vietnam at a Buddhist convention in Bangkok in 1971, he spoke out "to enlighten the civilized world of the horrors inflicted upon Buddhist monks, nuns and novices throughout Cambodia by North Vietnamese and Viet Cong invaders."

While he expressed support for the students who led a demonstration against the policies of the Cambodian republican government in 1973, he was publicly reprimanded by the Supreme Patriarch as the movements had been infiltrated by Khmers Rouges elements trying to overthrow the regime.

At the same time, Pang Khat was seen preaching in favour of the Khmer Republic and often paid tributes to the families of warriors who sacrificed their lives in the battlefield, for example, in places such as Wat Bo in Siem Reap.

=== Execution by the Khmers Rouge ===
Pang Khat taught at the Pali School and at the Faculty of Letters and Humanities of the University of Phnom Penh until 1975.

Along with the Supreme Patriarch and many other notorious intellectual monks such as Ponn Sompeach, Pang Khat was executed by the Khmers Rouges after the fall of Phnom Penh.

== Contribution ==
=== An intellectual monk in the Cambodian scholastic tradition ===
Pang Khat places himself in the Cambodian scholastic tradition and he himself claimed that his major influence came from Suttantaprija Ind known as Achar Ind who was a major Buddhist intellectual in Battambang at the beginning of the 20th century. In fact, "Pang Khat attributes his interest in producing a Khmer version of the Hitopadesa to the influence of Ind." Srey Hetopates was published in four volumes between 1971 and 1972: Making a Friendship, Destroying a Friendship, War and Peace. While it had previously been translated by Chhim Krasem from French to Khmer, Pang Khat returned to the original Sanskrit text to create an original Khmer version.

He was a contemporary of the more famous Chuon Nath.

While all his generation of intellectual monks were eradicated by the Khmers Rouges, a new generation of monks led by Kou Sopheap are currently trying to restore his intellectual legacy.

=== A new appreciation of the history of Buddhism in Cambodia ===
Pang Khat wrote a major contribution to the history of Buddhism in Cambodia, which had been largely disregarded by French archeologists who had been more interested in the presence of brahmanic religions since Angkorian times. Thus, according to Pang Khat, "Theravada Buddhism reached Southeast Asia as early as the second or third century A.D., while Mahayana Buddhism did not arrive in Cambodia until about A.D. 791."

=== Khmerization of education and cultural Independence in Cambodia ===
Along with Khmer linguist Khuon Sokhamphu, Pang Khat was involved in the study of Khmer phonetics and grammar. As a member of the Cultural Committee created by Royal Ordinance No. 13 on 24 March 1945, and first headed by Chuon Nath, he was also part of the movement which sought the khmerization of education away from the French colonial model to foster the Independence of Cambodia.

== Posterity ==
In December 1948, Pang Khat asked Suzanne Karpeles to intervene so that Sri Lanka would share some of the three relics of Buddha which are kept in Cambodia until this day for Buddhist worship.

== Bibliography ==
- Pang Khat (1970). "Buddhism in Cambodia." Série de Culture et Civilization Khmères. Tome 8. Phnom Penh: The Buddhist Institute.
- Pang Khat (2001). "History of Buddhism in Cambodia." In Buddhasasana 2500. Third Reprint. Phnom Penh: The Buddhist Institute.
- Khing Hocdy (2010). កម្រងសិក្សាកថាវប្បធម៌ខ្មែរ, ឧទ្ទិសប្រគេនព្រះវិរិយបណ្ឌិតោ ប៉ាងខាត, សហការណ៍នឹងបណ្ឌិតថោង ធែល (Cultural Essays in Honour of Venerable Pang Khat). Phnom Penh: Angkor Editions. 368 p.
