= Chummy =

Chummy is a nickname, and may refer to:

- Chummy Broomhall (1919–2017), American cross country skier
- Chummy Fleming (1863–1950), pioneer unionist
- Chummy MacGregor (1903–1973), American jazz keyboardist
- George Edward Gray, known as Chummy Gray (1873–1913), American baseball player

== See also ==
- Chum (disambiguation)
