= Museum of Cham Sculpture =

Museum in Da Nang, Vietnam

Coordinates: 16.059894°N 108.222641°E

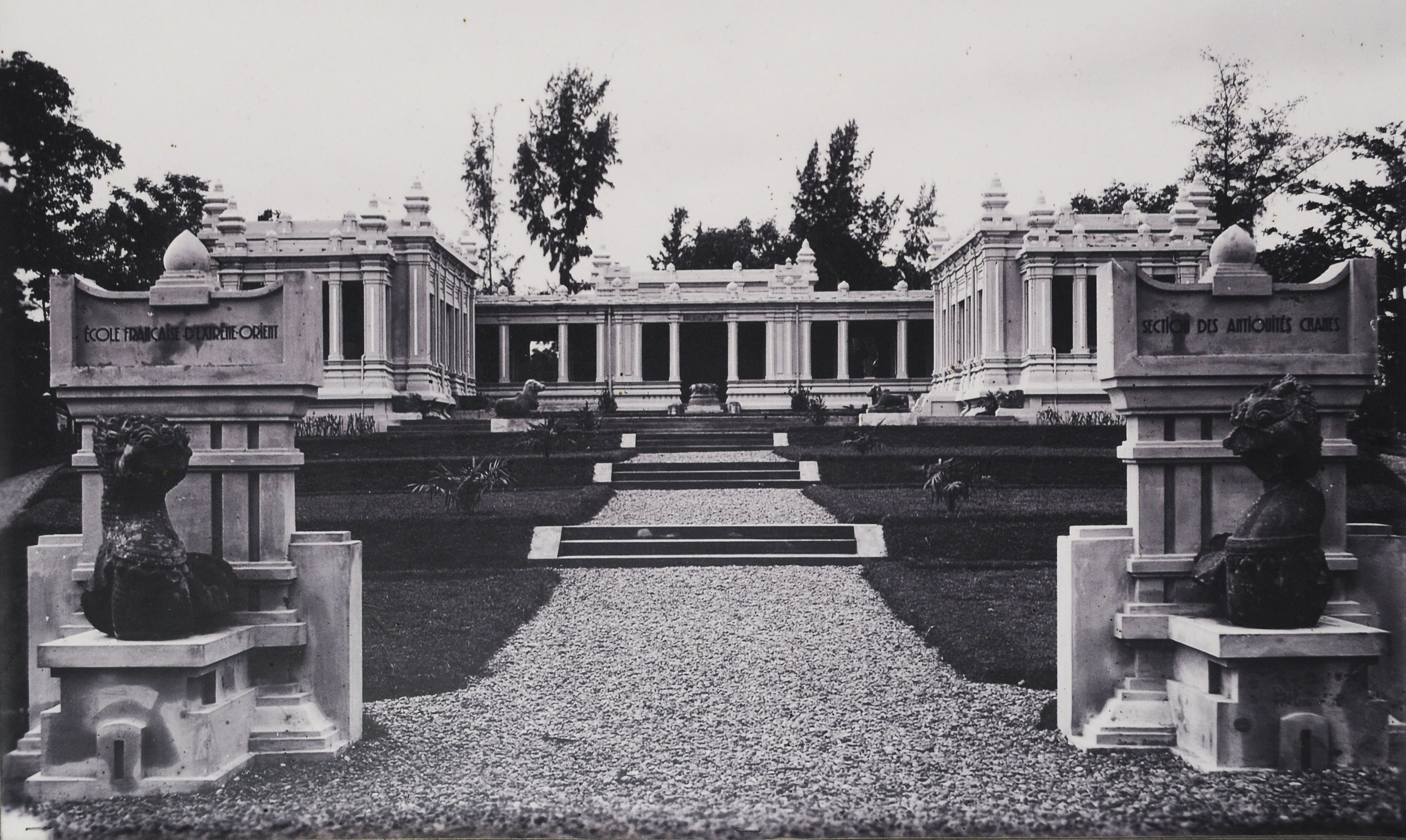
Early 20th-century view of the museum showing the École française d'Extrême-Orient (EFEO) sign.

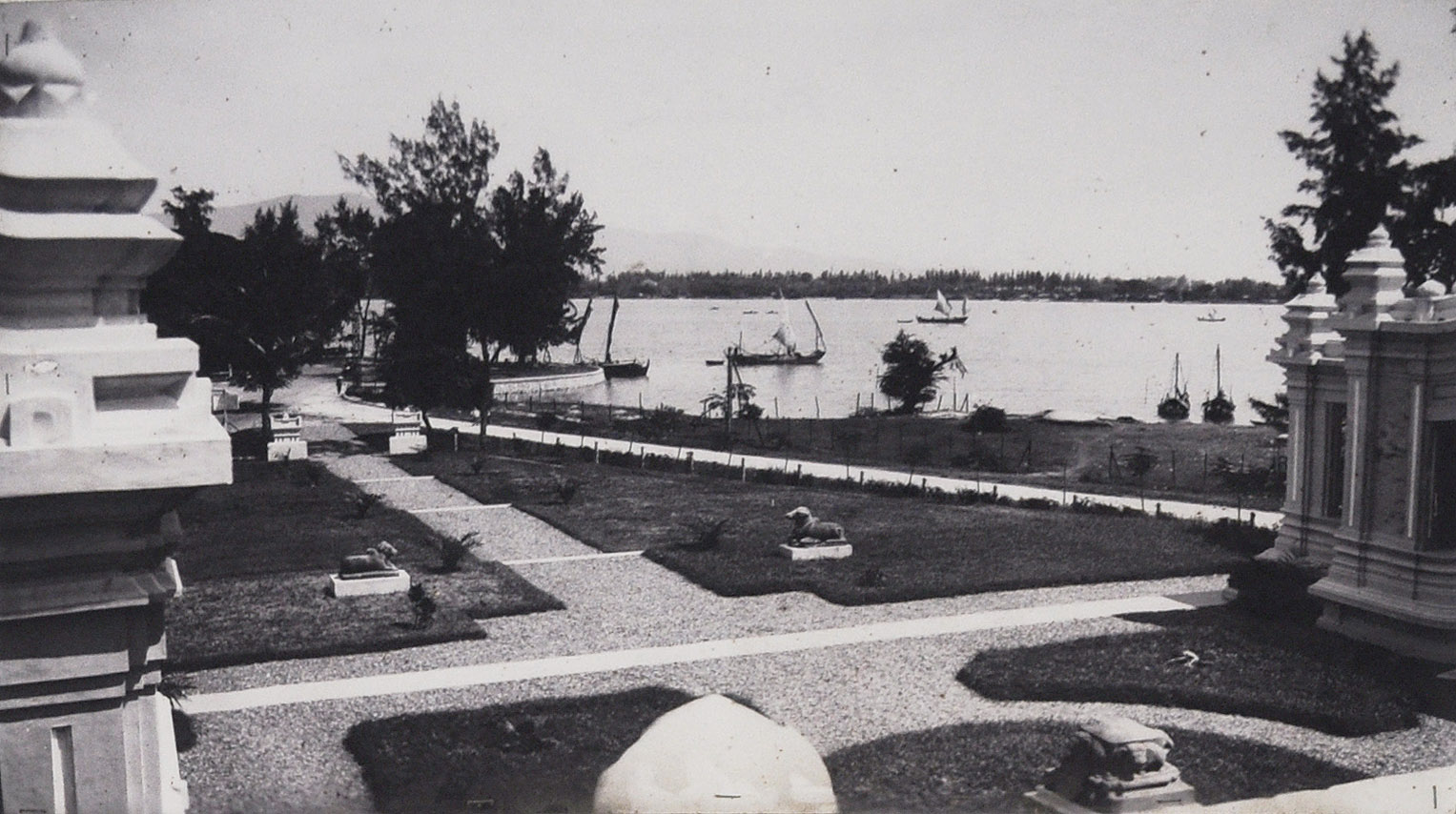
Early 20th-century view of the Han River from the museum site, showing its then-peaceful situation.

The Museum of Cham Sculpture (Vietnamese: Bảo tàng Điêu khắc Chăm) is a museum located in Hải Châu District, Đà Nẵng, central Vietnam, near the Han River.

The establishment of a Cham sculpture museum in Da Nang was first proposed in 1902 by the Department of Archaeology of EFEO. Henri Parmentier, a prominent archaeologist of the department, made great contributions to the campaign for its construction. Reportedly founded in 1915 as the Musée Henri Parmentier, its first building opened in 1919 and was designed by two French architects, M. Deleval and M. Auclair, who were inspired by Parmentier to use some traditional Cham elements in the composition. Prior to the establishment of the museum, the site was known as the "garden of sculptures" and many Cham sculptures that had been collected in Da Nang, Quảng Nam and elsewhere had been brought there over the preceding twenty years.

The museum has been expanded twice. The first expansion was in the mid-1930s, with two new galleries providing display space for the objects added in the 1920s and 1930s. Henri Parmentier directed the display based on the areas where sculptures were found. The 1000 meter square of floor space was arranged for the collections of Mỹ Sơn, Trà Kiệu, Đồng Dương, Tháp Mẫm, Quang Tri, Quảng Ngãi, Bình Định and Kon Tum. In 2002, the Museum was again expanded with the two-story building providing an additional 1000 square meters. The new building provides not only space for display, but also for storage, a library, a restoration workshop and offices for staff.

Before 2007, the Museum was managed by Da Nang Museums, an administrative organ in charge of the city's museums and heritage. In 2008 it became affiliated with the city Department of Culture, Sport and Tourism.

The museum houses the world's largest collection of Cham sculpture and is a popular tourist destination.

== Sculptures at the Museum ==
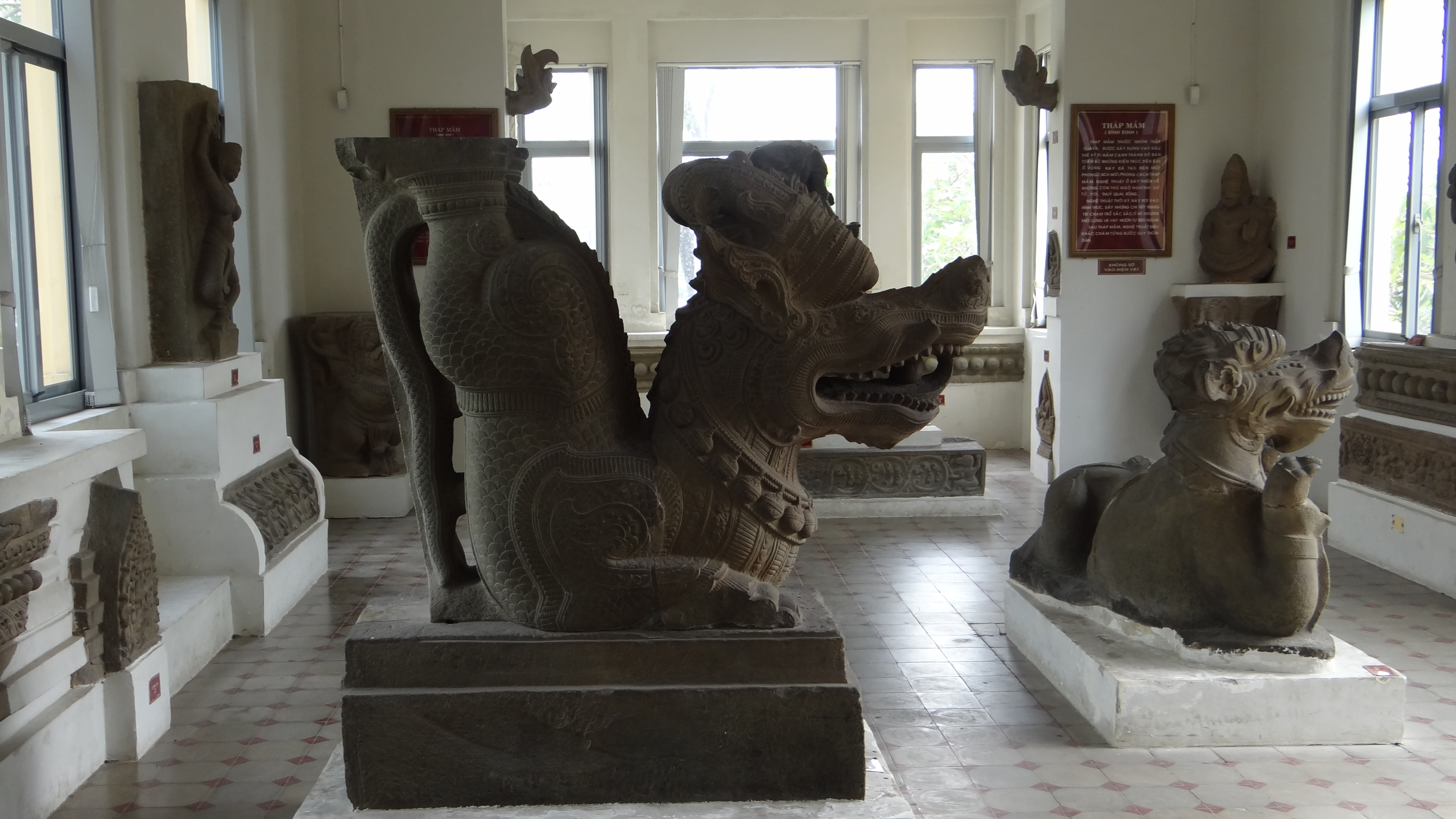
Dragon, 13th century

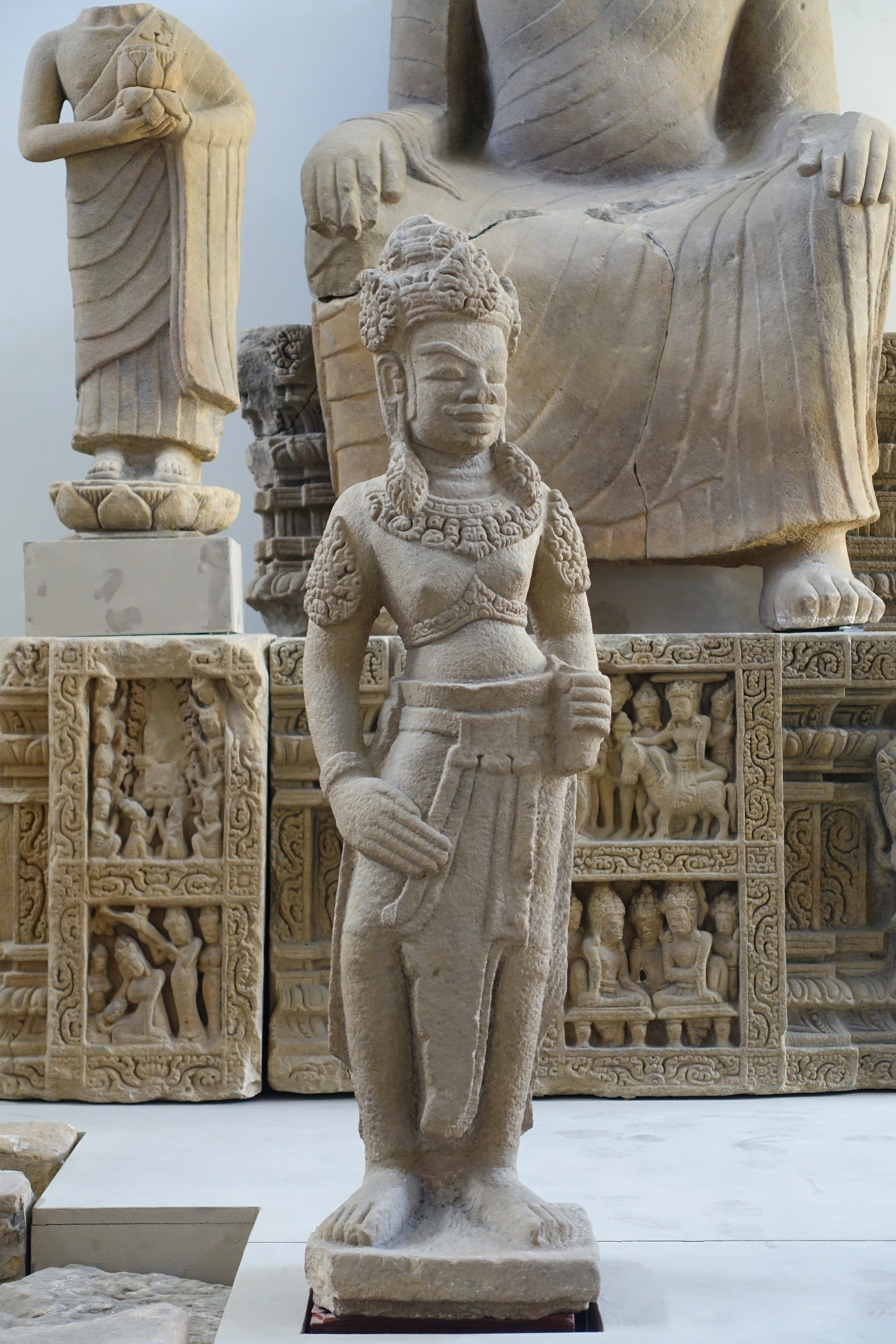
late 9th to early 10th century

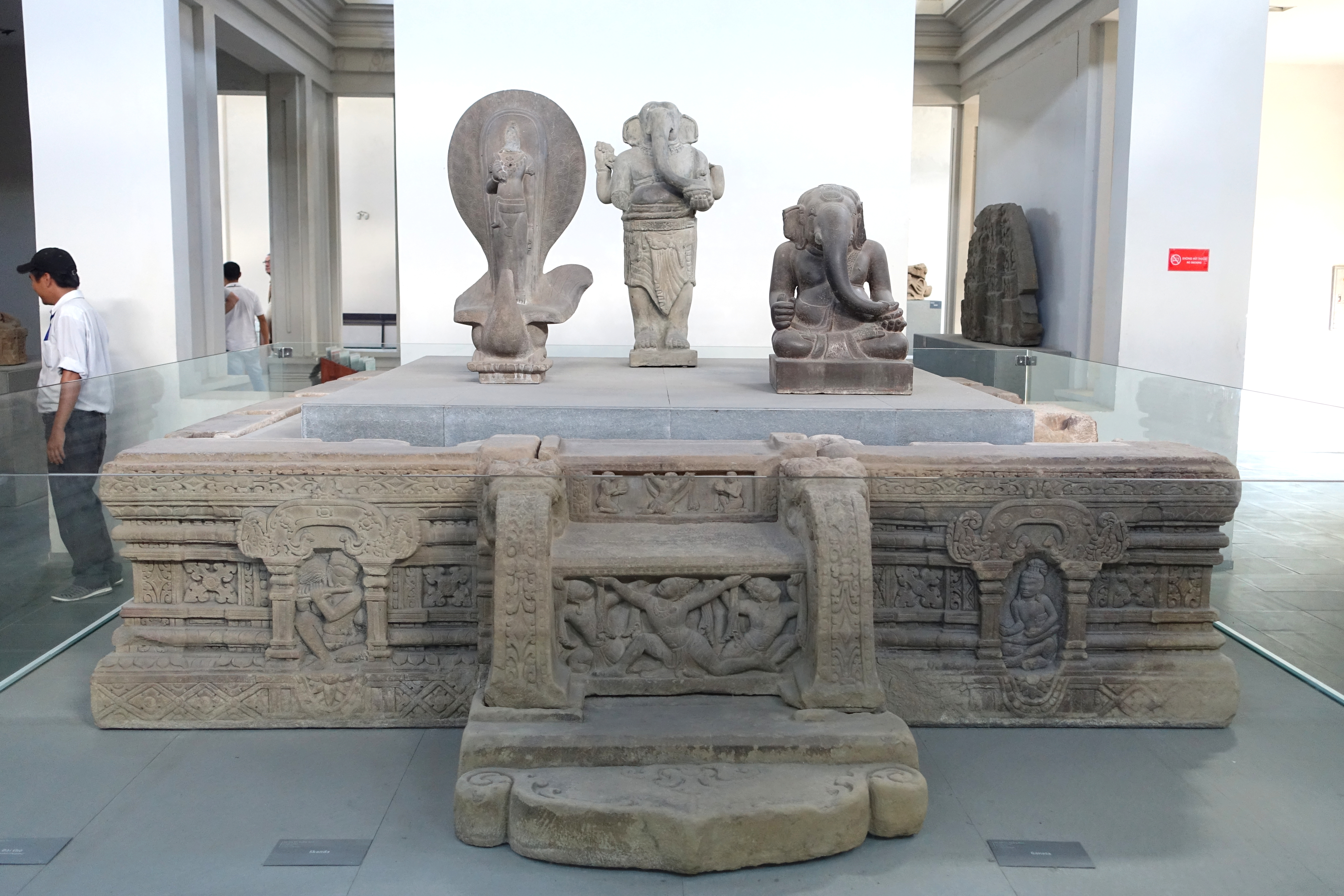
7th century

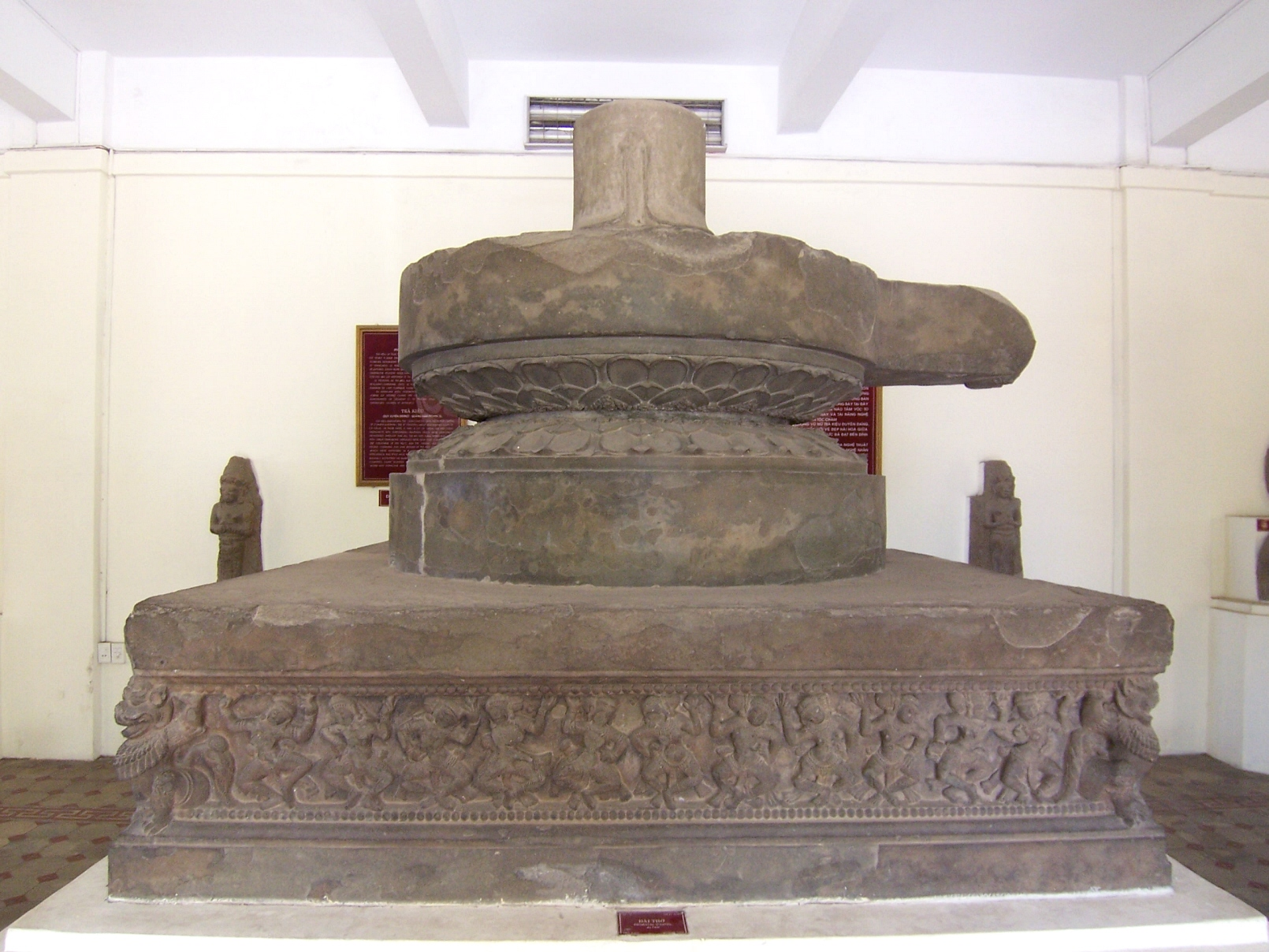
Shiva lingam at the Museum of Cham Sculpture

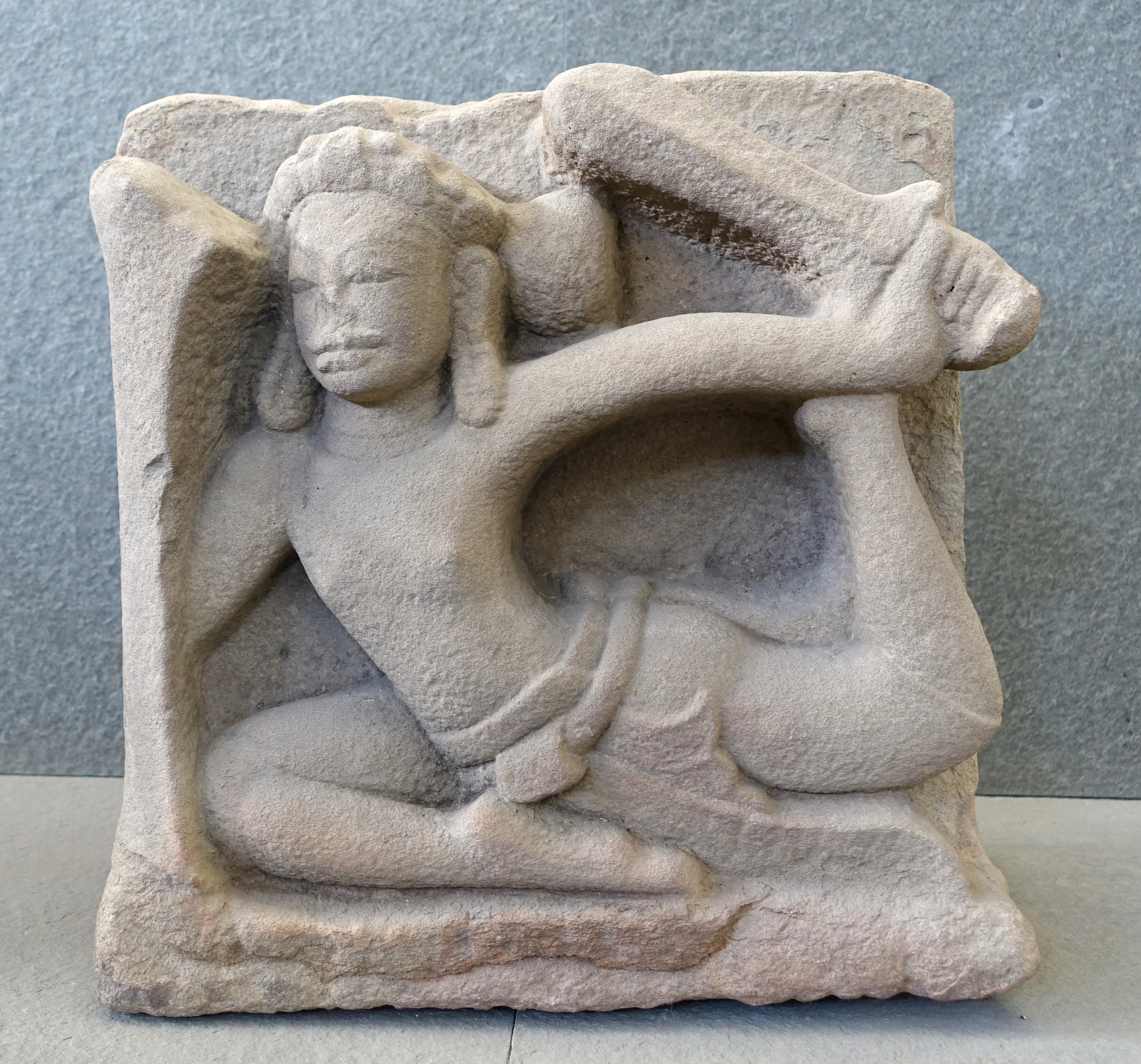
Flying Warrior, Mỹ Sơn, 10th century

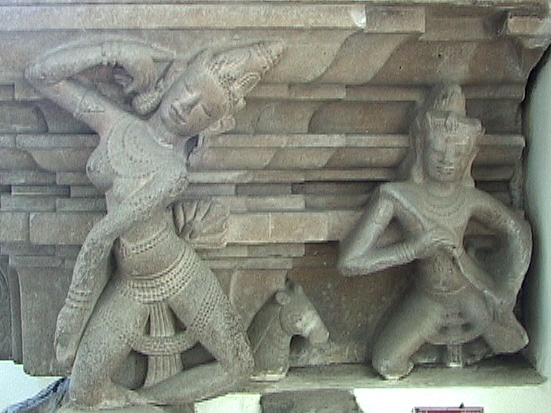
Danseuse apsara et musicien gandharva, 10th century

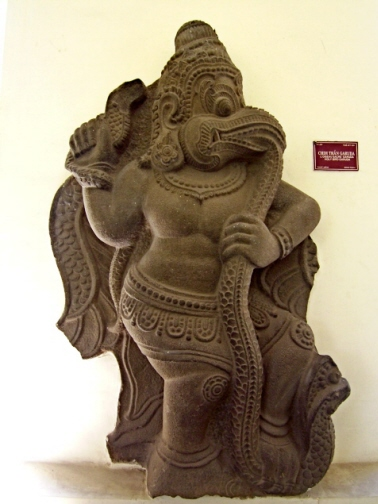
Statue of Garuda, Thap Mam style, 13th century CE

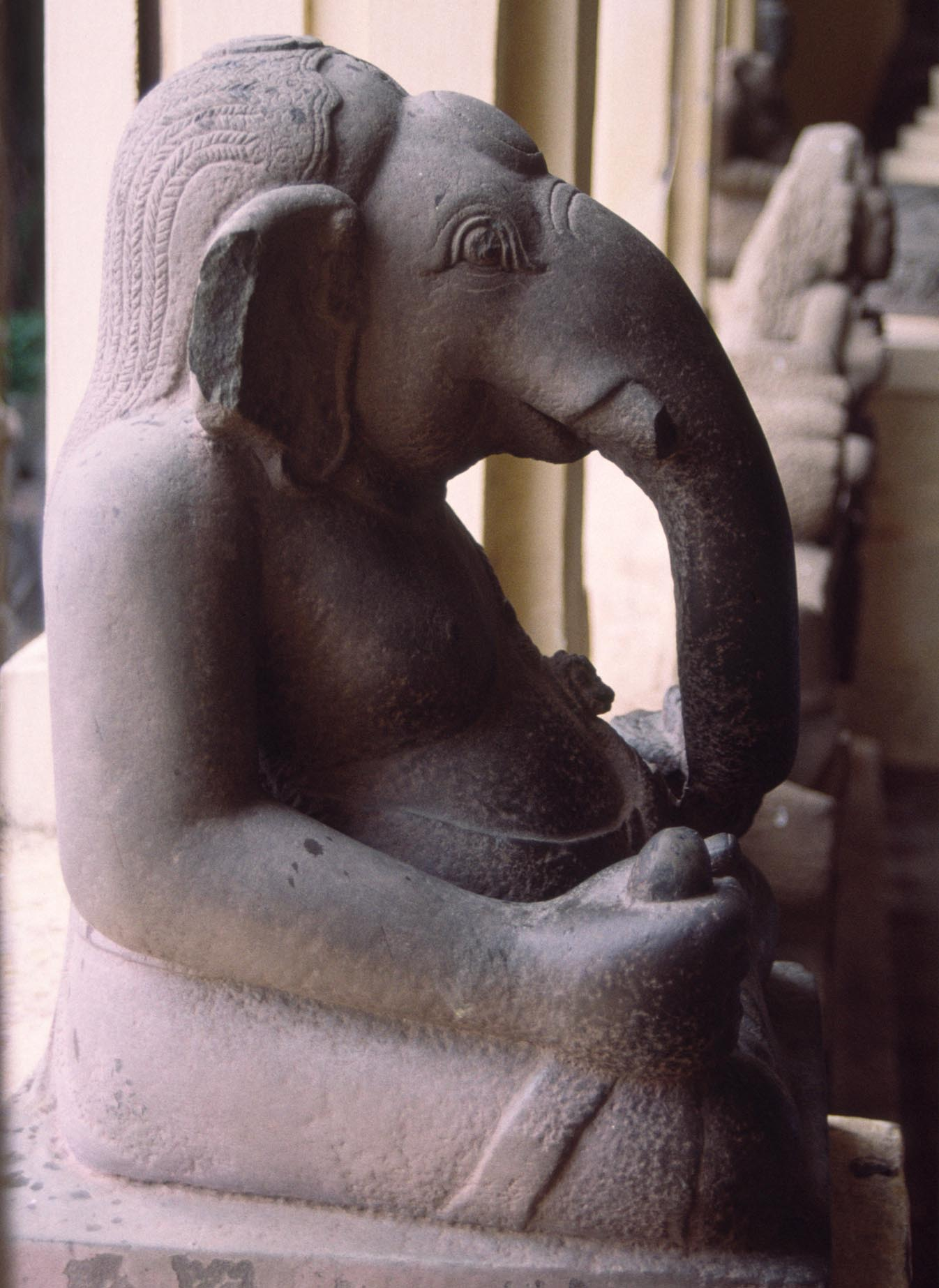
Ganesha 8th century

== See also ==
- Art of Champa

== Literature ==
- Lenzi, Iola (2004). Museums of Southeast Asia. Singapore: Archipelago Press. p. 200. ISBN 981-4068-96-9.
- Parmentier, Henri (2003). Cham sculpture of the Tourane Museum, Da Nang, Vietnam: Religious ceremonies and superstitions of Champa. White Lotus Press. pp. 142 pages. ISBN 978-9747534702.
- Guillon, Emmanuel (2001). Cham Art: Treasures from the Da Nang Museum, Vietnam. London: Thames & Hudson. pp. 204 pages. ISBN 978-0500975930.
- Duoc, Huynh Thi (2006). Cham Sculpture and Indian Mythology. Danang: Danang Publishing House. pp. 75 pages.
