= Henri Parmentier =

French archaeologist and art historian

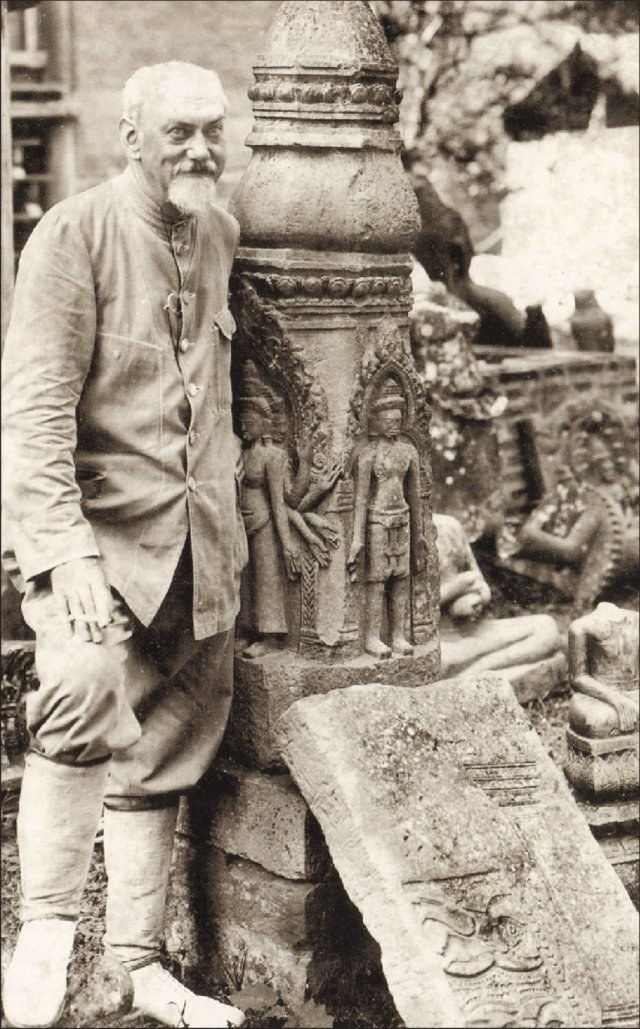
- Henri Parmentier in Angkor c. 1930
- Born: Henri Ernest Jean Parmentier; 3 January 1870; Paris
- Died: 22 February 1949 (aged 79); Phnom Penh
- Education: École nationale supérieure des Beaux-Arts
- Spouse: Jeanne Leuba (m. 1905)
- Scientific career
- Fields: Archaeology
- Workplaces: École française d'Extrême-Orient

Henri Ernest Jean Parmentier (French pronunciation: [ɑ̃ʁi ɛʁnɛst ʒɑ̃ paʁmɑ̃tje]; 3 January 1870 – 22 February 1949) was a French architect, art historian and archaeologist. Parmentier became one of the first European specialists in the archaeology of Indochina. He has documented, depicted and preserved many Khmer, Cham and Lao monuments.

== Early years ==
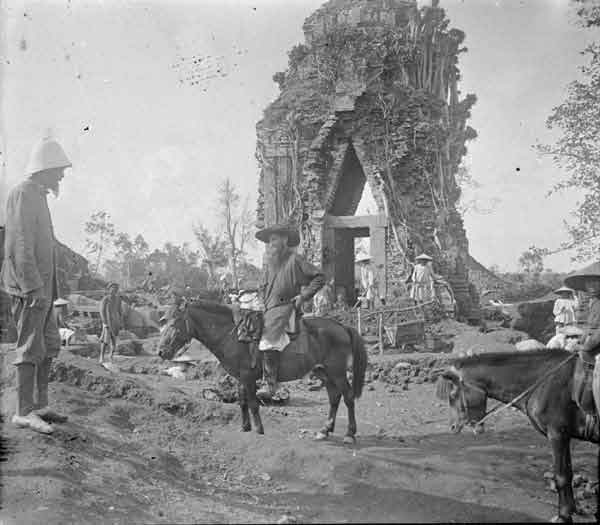
Parmentier (left) and Carpeaux (center) in Đồng Dương.

Henri Ernest was born on 3 January 1870 in Paris; his father was a painter working in Lycée de Reims. In 1891 Parmentier entered the École nationale supérieure des Beaux-Arts graduating in 1905 with a diploma in architecture. In 1896 he got employed by the colonial administration in Tunisia and over time he developed a profound interest in archaeology. During this period Parmentier created a detailed plan of the Temple of Saturn in Dougga to assist with its restoration. This job was awarded with an honourable mention on the exhibition of Société des Artistes Français. In 1900 Parmentier joined archaeologist Henri Dufour and photograph Charles Carpeaux in the Archaeological mission in Indochina (later renamed École française d'Extrême-Orient, also known as EFEO). They went to Siam to study Angkor Wat that had been located on its territory. Khmer monuments were largely unknown to the Westerners and almost uncharted. Studying Khmer history became Parmentier's lifework.

In 1902—1905 Parmentier and Carpeaux studied, described, depicted and preserved Cham monuments in Vietnam: a buddhist temple complex Đồng Dương (1902), a Hindu temple complex Mỹ Sơn (1903—1904), the Chánh Lộ temple (1905) -- the latter was studied by Parmentier alone. The study made from the expedition trip to Đồng Dương was presented by Parmentier and Carpeaux at the Congress of the École française d'Extrême-Orient. Parmentier studied the architecture of Java in order to compare it to Cham architectural styles.

== As a head of the École française d'Extrême-Orient ==
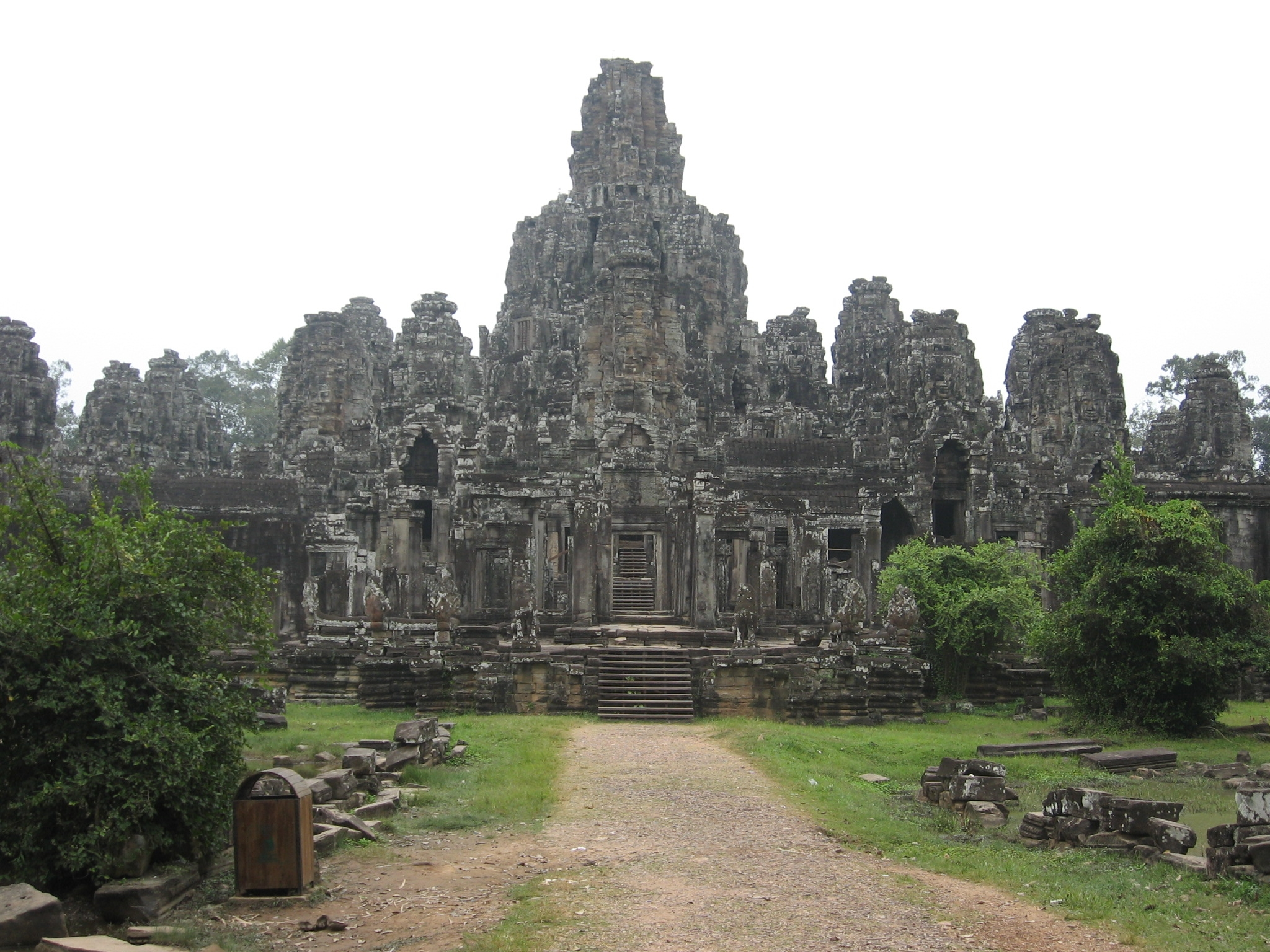
The Bayon temple in Angkor.

In 1904 Parmentier was appointed the head of the archaeological department of the École; he stayed on this position for 28 years until 1932. Parmentier's duties included defining the main course of the École's work in Cambodia. In 1905 Henri married journalist and writer Jeanne Leuba who travelled with him and took a big part in the fieldwork.

Parmentier studied and conserved the Po Nagar Cham temple in 1906—1907. During his next expedition to Cambodia Parmentier depicted and restored Khmer monuments in Serei Saophoan, Battambang Province, Siem Reap Province and Angkor, with special attention to Bayon. From Cambodia he went to the South of Vietnam and took part in restoring the Po Klong Garai temple (1908). In 1913—1914 Parmentier reorganised the museum of the École française d'Extrême-Orient. He visited Cambodia from time to time, documenting Angkor and Sambor Prei Kuk (1911); he also visited Kampong Thom city and Banteay Prey Nokor. Parmentier studied Chinese tombs in Northern Vietnam in Bắc Ninh Province (Vietnamese: Nghi Vệ), helped creating a permanent exhibition for the Museum of Cham Sculpture that was under construction in Da Nang—in 1936 the museum was renamed after him. He directed the École in 1918—1920. In 1920 Parmentier received an award for his book on Cham architecture.

Parmentier visited the ruins of the Lao temple complex Vat Phou, he paid special attention to Krol Roméas (Phnom Kulen plateau), Angkor and the Bayon temple in particular, which he helped reconstructing. His collaboration with Louis Finot and Victor Golubev on Banteay Srei, a Khmer temple complex, was published as a book in 1926.

== After retirement ==
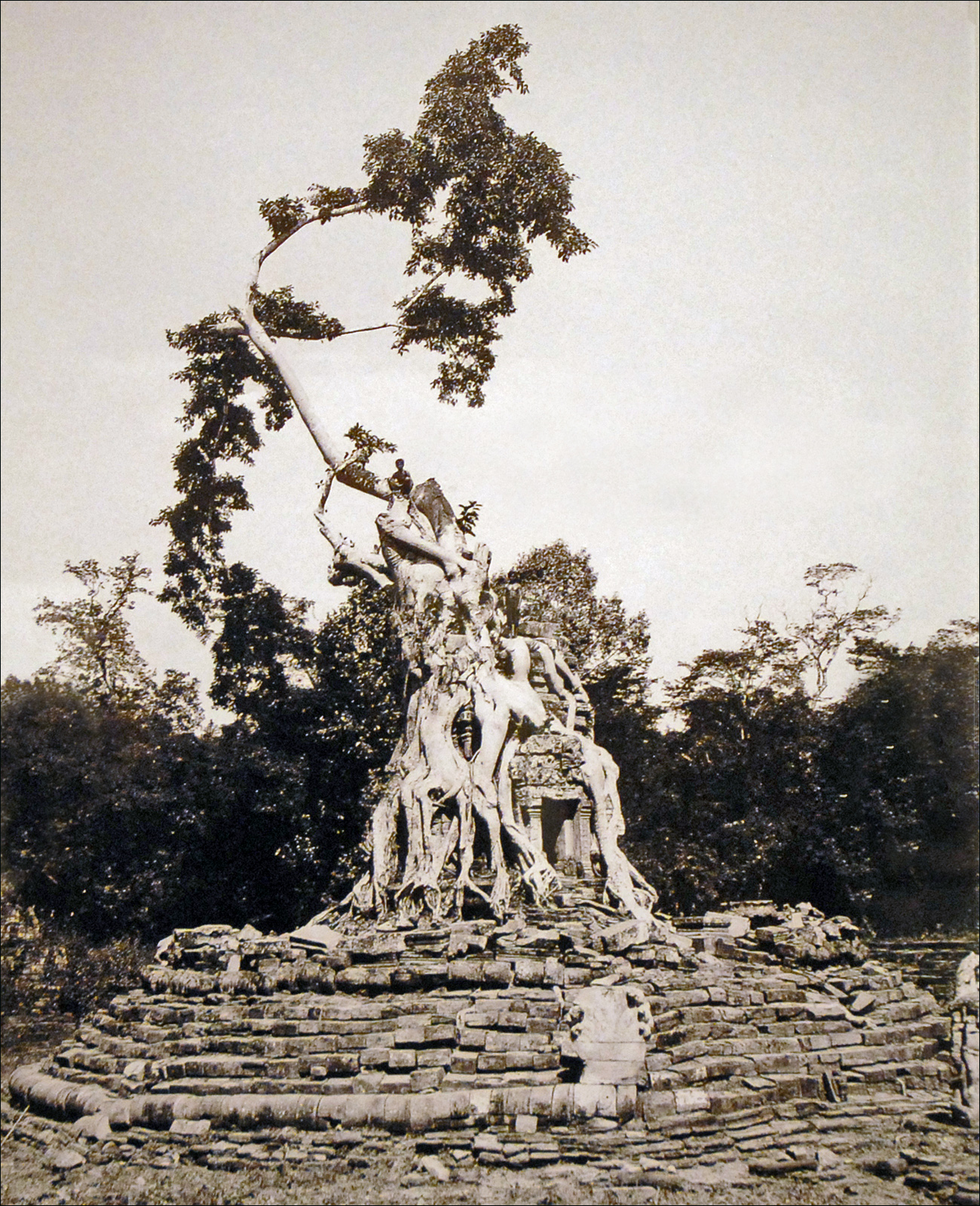
The Neak Pean temple before the cleanup

Parmentier retired in 1932 aged 62. He left his position at the École, received a title of the honorary head of the archaeological department and moved to Phnom Penh. Despite being retired, Parmentier continued his fieldwork and his research working on a descriptive list of important monuments in Laos and a book titled "The Art of Laos" that he left unfinished. He had created a draft of a tourist guidebook on Angkor monuments, which was published posthumously. Parmentier died on 22 February 1949 in Phnom Penh.

== Selected works ==
- Parmentier, Henri (1909–1918). Inventaire descriptif des monuments cams de l'Annam.
- Parmentier, Henri (1927). L'Art khmer primitif.
- Parmentier, Henri (1939). L'Art khmer classique: Monuments du quadrant nord-est.
- Parmentier, Henri (1954). L'Art du Laos.
