= Trà Kiệu pedestal =

7th or 10th-century Vietnamese carving

The Trà Kiệu pedestal is a Champa sandstone pedestal from the Trà Kiệu archaeological site in Vietnam, dated to either the 7th or 10th century CE. The pedestal was uncovered from the Hindu temple site in the late 19th century and is currently on display in the Da Nang Museum of Cham Sculpture in central Vietnam.

The pedestal is best known for the intricate, four-sided narrative relief along its base. It is the only visual evidence from the Trà Kiệu site thought to relate to the Rāmāyana, and one of only three known Champa pedestals to have narrative carvings (the other two being from the nearby Mỹ Son and Ðồng Duong sites).

== Description ==
The pedestal is a 190×190 cm wide, 54 cm tall square carved from sandstone. A linga-yoni currently sits atop the pedestal, though this was most likely not included with the original structure. Each of the pedestal's four vertical faces has a narrative relief; they have been labelled Side A through D. On each of the corners between these reliefs a lion is depicted holding up the rest of the structure. These lions have stylistic similarities to sculptural lions found elsewhere at Trà Kiệu. The pedestal is very well preserved, with only relatively minor damage to each of the reliefs.

=== Side A ===
According to Tran Ky Phuong’s interpretation of the reliefs as relating to the Rāmāyana, Side A begins with Rama's journey to the kingdom of Videha. Rama, an avatar of the Hindu god Vishnu, competes in an archery contest for the right to marry the princess of Videha, Sita. Side A ends with Rama's victory by bending the king's holy bow. There are fifteen figures on this relief in total, two of which appear to be gandharvas (male celestial performers).

=== Side B ===
The relief on Side B is interpreted as ambassadors from Videha informing Rama's father of his son's marriage, and the king travelling to attend the wedding. There are sixteen figures in total.

=== Side C ===
This relief presents images of the preparation for Rama and Sita's wedding, with eighteen figures.

=== Side D ===
Side D depicts the wedding celebration. Eleven apsaras (female celestial dancers) celebrate the wedding by singing, cheering and dancing. This side also appears to connect to the two gandharvas from Side A, presenting these reliefs as a unified and continuous narrative.

== Issues of excavation and reconstruction ==
Both the pedestal and the linga-yoni currently atop it were discovered in the late 19th century by French archaeologists at the Trà Kiệu site. Both pieces were removed and transported to Tourane (contemporary Da Nang). The exact location of these original positions is unknown, but it is likely that the pedestal was found in the smaller of the two temple buildings at Trà Kiệu. This temple is in the north-west of the site and was likely constructed before the larger temple to the south. The pedestal would most likely have been placed in the centre of this temple.

The French placed several different icons atop the pedestal at different times throughout the colonial period. The linga-yoni currently atop the pedestal was placed there by French archaeologists in Da Nang in the 1930s. This is the form of the pedestal on display in the Da Nang Museum, though there is no definitive evidence to suggest that the two sections were originally presented together at Trà Kiệu. The pedestal may instead have functioned as the base of a statue, as support for sacred objects or as an offering pedestal. The Trà Kiệu pedestal and its linga-yoni must therefore be studied independently.

== Dating ==
The Trà Kiệu pedestal is generally dated to either the mid-to-late 7th century or the early 10th century CE. The argument for the 7th century is based largely on an inscription by the Champa king Prakāśadharma that was also found at Trà Kiệu. Through this inscription, Prakāśadharma commemorates his reconstruction of the temple and dedicates it to Vālmīki, the legendary author of the Rāmāyana. Aside from the pedestal, it is the only known source from Trà Kiệu to reference the Rāmāyana. It is therefore possible that the pedestal was added to the temple during Prakāśadharma's construction project. Some scholars have assumed from this association that the pedestal dates to approximately 657–687 CE, given the dates written on Prakāśadharma’s other inscriptions.

The argument for dating the pedestal to the 10th century CE is founded on similarities between the decoration of the reliefs and other 10th-century Southeast Asian artworks. Depictions of the Rāmāyana in art and architecture appear to have been common in Champa, Cambodia and even Java during the 10th century. One of the 10th century Champa temples of Khuong Mỹ, for instance, presents narrative reliefs of the Rāmāyana along its foundation.

== Interpretations ==
The images depicted on the Trà Kiệu pedestal's relief panels has been a continuous subject of scholarly debate. The first interpretation of their themes was proposed in 1929 by Jean Pryzluski, who argued that the illustrations represented the legend of Kuandinya, the mythic founder of Funan. George Cœdès' 1931 response contended that it was highly unlikely for a pre-Angkorian Cambodian king to be represented on a Champa pedestal. Instead, Cœdès interpreted the scenes as images from a Vaisnavite text, the Bhagavata Purāna. In 1995, Pham Hūm Mý suggested that the illustrations were of the royal family from the Mahābhārata. The most widely accepted interpretation to date was proposed in 2000 by Tran Ky Phuong, who argued that the pedestal depicts scenes from the wedding of Rama and Sita within the Rāmāyana.

There is also significant disagreement over the purpose of this depiction. If the pedestal's aforementioned association with Prakāśadharma is accepted, then it is possible that the king chose the subject of Rama's wedding to reminisce about his own parents' marriage. Prakāśadharma appears to have been born of the marriage between a Champa prince and a Khmer (Cambodian) princess; the story of the Rāmāyana, wherein a prince marries a foreign princess, has some similarities. In doing so, Prakāśadharma may have been attempting to connect his own heritage to the hero of the Rāmāyana. Images of Rama throughout Champa appear to have been intended as reflections of the king's own characteristics and abilities, so it is possible that the pedestal was used by Prakāśadharma—or another Cham king, if one prefers the 10th century chronology—to promote his reign.

Other scholars have proposed that the reliefs were created as reflections of Champa courtly culture through the narrative of the Rāmāyana, and may therefore have been intended to commemorate royal–divine interactions. This argument is founded on the basis that, despite Champa most likely consisting of politically distinct and independent polities, there appear to have been courtly customs and structures shared between the region's different kingdoms. Within this framework, the motifs of archery and dancing women upon the Trà Kiệu pedestal are interpreted as symbols of the royal court, while the association of the assumed 'human' figures with the apsaras are positioned as evidence for royal–divine interaction.
