= Champa Si Ton =

Folktale from Laos

Champa Si Ton or Campa Si Ton (Lao: ຈຳປາສີ່ຕົ້ນ; English: The Four Frangipani Trees, The Four Champa Trees, The Four Frangipani Brothers, Four Sprouts of the Champa-tree) is a folktale from the Lao people.

== History ==
Indian scholarship suggests that the Southeast Asian folktale of Champa Si Ton ("Four Champa Trees") was inspired by Hindu literature. French researcher Louis Finot translated the story as Campa si ton and stated that the Laotian tale is a translation from a Pali text titled Campārājajātaka.

== Summary ==
In the kingdom of Paňcāla (sic), mighty and virtuous king Cakkiņa and queen Ańgī have a daughter they name Padumā. One day, the king begins to have visions of a terrible fate that will befall their land: a duo of monsters will come to devour them and destroy the kingdom. To protect the princess, they hide her in a big drum. The kingdom tries to resist the onslaught of the monsters, but they fall.

Padumā prays to god Indra to save her. To help her, Indra curses the king of Paňcāla, Cūlaṇi, with a strange disease. Cūlaṇi's advisors suggest he seeks a wife in a remote kingdom. Cūlaṇi travels to the destroyed kingdom and finds a golden stag, which guides the monarch to the drum. He finds Padumā inside the drum and takes her home.

Despite being already married to a queen named Ańgī, king Cūlaṇi has no son. He marries Padumā as his second wife and she prays to Indra for children. The god makes it that four devaputta reincarnate as Padumā's sons, but the first queen takes the children and casts them in the river, and replaces the boys for four puppies. King Cūlaṇi falls for the trick and banishes Padumā to be a pigkeeper.

The four sons are saved by the gardener. Years later, queen Ańgī learns of their survival and pays them a visit with poisoned cakes. The children eat the cakes and die. Their foster parents cremate the children and from their ashes four frangipani trees sprout. Ańgī orders the trees to be felled, but hatches and axes are not able to cut their trunks.

The trees are rooted out and cast in the river. The trees wash up in the hermitage of hermit Aggicakkhu. One of his priests plucks a flower from one of the trees and blood spurts from the branch. Aggicakkhu orders the trees to be burnt. He then sprinkles sacred water on the ashes and the four boys are reborn. Each of the princes is given a name: Settarakuman, Pittarakuman, Suvaṇṇakuman and Pexanatnakuman.

The boys learn magic and flying, are given a magic vessel by Indra, and go to conquer the kingdoms. Three princes go to rule three kingdoms and the fourth prince, Nandakumara, visits Paňcāla and writes a menacing message for king Cūlaṇi: they are to give them queen Padumā, lest they destroy the kingdom.

Fearing for his kingdom, King Cūlaṇi orders his ministers to find the fallen queen. Eventually, king Cūlaṇi goes aboard the princes' vessel and surrenders his kingdom to the four invaders. The four princes learn the whole truth and their mother, Padumā, is restored as queen, while Ańgī is made to herd the pigs.

== Variants ==
=== Southeast Asia ===
The story is reported to have circulated as early as the times of the Lan Na and Lan Xang Kingdoms. According to Yves Godineau, the story "dates back" to the reign of Sourigna Vongsa.

=== Laos ===
In one version of the story, King Maha Suvi is married to two queens, Mahesi and Mahesi Noi. Queen Mahesi gives birth to the four princes, who are taken to the water in a basket. When they are young, they are poisoned by the second queen and buried in the village, four champa trees sprouting on their graves. The second queen learns of their survival and orders the trees to be felled down and thrown in the river. A monk sees their branches with flowers and takes them off the river.

In another version, provided by Payungporn Nonthavisarut and Pathom Hongsuwan, the Champa Si Ton is preceded by a narrative about Chao Pho Pak Hueng (or Thao Khatanam), who visits Panjanakhorn and rescues princess Khamkong from the drum. In this version, the kingdom is resurrected and the monster is killed.

=== India ===
In an Indian version of the story, the King of Panchala marries a second wife, Padma, who gives birth to four princes. The royal children are taken by the envious first queen, Angī. They are buried and become champa trees, but are saved by a sage named Agni Chaksu and given the names Sita Kumāra, Pita Kumāra, Suvarna Kumāra and Vajra Nanda Kumāra.

=== Thailand ===
In a Thai tale, Champa Si Ton or The Four Princes (Thai: สี่ยอดกุมาร), king Phaya Chulanee, ruler of the City of Panja, is already married to a woman named Queen Akkee. He travels abroad and reaches the deserted ruins of a kingdom (City of Chakkheen). He saves a princess named Pathumma from inside a drum she was hiding in when some terrifying creatures attacked her kingdom, leaving her as the sole survivor. They return to Panja and marry. Queen Pathumma is pregnant with four sons, to the envy of the first wife. She replaces the sons for dogs to humiliate the second queen, and throws the babies in the river. A version of the tale is also preserved in palm-leaf manuscript form. The tale continues as the four princes are rescued from the water and buried in the garden, only to become champa trees and later regaining their human shapes.

== See also ==
- Saat Bhai Champa (Bengali folktale)
- Calumniated Wife
- The Three Golden Children (folklore)
- The Real Mother (Indian folktale)
