= Chum =

Chum may refer to:

== Broadcasting ==
- CHUM Limited, a defunct Canadian media company
- CHUM Radio, now Bell Media Radio, a Canadian radio broadcasting company
- CHUM (AM), a Toronto radio station
- CHUM-FM, a Toronto radio station
- CHUM Chart, a Canadian record chart
- Chums, a segment on the TV series SMTV Live

== People ==
- Chum Bunrong (born 1950), Cambodian diplomat
- Choun Chum (born 1986), Cambodian footballer
- Khieu Chum (1907–1975), Cambodian Buddhist monk
- Chum Mey (born c. 1930), Cambodian genocide survivor
- Chum Taylor (1927–2025), Australian motorcycle speedway rider

== Other uses ==
- Chum, a mako shark character in Finding Nemo
- "Chum" (song), by American rapper Earl Sweatshirt
- Chum (tent), used by Uralic nomads
- Chum (film), an American horror thriller film
- Chum salmon (Oncorhynchus keta)
- Chumming, a fishing practice
- Chumbox, a style of online advertisement.
- Chums (paper), a defunct British boys newspaper
- Centre hospitalier de l'Université de Montréal, a university hospital network in Montreal, Canada
- Chums Scout Patrols, early Scouting groups
- Como, Italy
- Chums: How a Tiny Caste of Oxford Tories Took Over the UK, 2022 book by Simon Kuper
