= Jeanne Leuba =

French journalist and orientalist

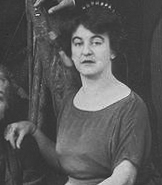
- Born: 8 November 1882; Paris, France
- Died: 24 July 1979 (aged 96); Pettenbach, Austria
- Occupations: Writer, journalist, poet
- Spouse: Henri Parmentier (m. 1905; died 1949)
- Writing career
- Language: French

Jeanne Leuba (8 November 1882, Paris – 24 July 1979, Pettenbach) was a French journalist, writer and poet. Having spent many years in Indochina and Cambodia, she is considered one of the most impressive of the women colonial novelists.

== Life ==
Jeanne Leuba was born on 8 November 1882 into a Parisian Protestant family. Her father was a well-known anatomical drawing artist A. J. Leuba. In childhood she was trained to become a concert pianist. In 1905 she married Henri Parmentier, a director of EFEO (École Française d'Extrême Orient) archaeological service, and went with him to Indochina. In the colony Leuba accompanied Parmentier in all his archaeological exploration treks in the local bush. From her diaries we know about the taxing conditions of their traveling. Many remote places that Parmentier wanted to study could be reached only by sampans, canoes, ox-driven carts or on foot. Having diverse responsibilities ranging from technical assistance to mending of clothes and shopping for provisions, Leuba called herself her husband’s multi-task collaborator.

She published several articles on the Angkor monuments and two books on the ethnic group of Chams in Southeast Asia: Les Chams d’autrefois et d’aujourd’hui (1915), and Un royaume disparu: les Chams et leur art (1923). In 1920s and 1930s Leuba was actively writing novels on Indochinese themes, including L’Aile du feu published in 1920. Among all her writings best remembered are her collection of poetry La tristesse du soleil, discussed by Patrick Laude, and Le metis ensorcelle (1941), mentioned in general survey works on Francophone Indochinese literature.

After Parmentier’s death in 1949 Leuba decided to remain in the colony. In 1945 she was detained in the Japanese concentration camp and after being released worked for the local French-language newspapers and the radio of Phnom Penh. In 1954 Leuba prepared for publication posthumous work Parmentier L’Art de Laos. In 1966 she left Cambodia, where Cambodian Civil War was about to start, and settled in Austria where she remained until her death on 24 July 1979.

== Publications ==
- La Tristesse du soleil, Plon-Nourrit et Cie, 1913
- Les Ruines d'Angkor, Imprimerie administrative, 1914
- Les Chams d'autrefois et d'aujourd'hui, La Revue Indochinoise, 1915
- Pour un bijou, La Revue Indochinoise, 1917
- L’Ombre nuptiale, Plon-Nourrit et Cie, 1919
- Loin du monde, La Revue Indochinoise, juin 1919, p. 563–573
- L'Aile de feu, Plon-Nourrit, 1920
- Frick en exil, Perrin, 1923
- Un royaume disparu. Les Chams et leur art, G. Van Oest et cie, 1923 (Preface of Louis Finot)
- La Fin d'un roi cambodgien, Éditions de la revue "Extrême-Asie", 1928
- La Brève lumière, E. Flammarion, 1930
- Le Personnel reconnaissant, Le Petit Écho de la Mode, n^{o} 37, 10 September 1933
- Le Métis ensorcelé. La Roue du temps. Condiments. Les Deux nuits de l'as de trèfle. Camille ou l'ingénue malgré lui, J. Aspar, 1941
- Le Mystère de Bel-Abri. Le Rubis volé. La Servante des Aiguilles, J. Aspar, 1942
- Écumes, J. Aspar, 1943
- L'Art du Laos (with Henri Parmentier), Imprimerie Nationale (Publications of l'École Française d'Extrême-Orient), 1954
- Angkor. Guide Henri Parmentier (with Henri Parmentier), E.K.L.I.P, 1960
