= Sam Bunthoeun =

Khmer Buddhist monk

Preah Phikho Sam Bunthoeun ព្រះភិក្ខុ សំ ប៊ុនធឿន

Personal life
- Born: 1957 Kandal Province, Kingdom of Cambodia
- Died: 2003, age 47 Langka Temple, Phnom Penh, Cambodia

Religious life
- Religion: Buddhism
- School: Theravada

Senior posting
- Students: Kou Sopheap

Sam Bunthoeun (1957 - 2003) was a Cambodian Buddhist monk who was active in restoring the religious tradition of meditation known as vipassana in the 1990s until he was fatally shot on February 6, 2003. He was "one of Cambodia's most prominent teachers of vipassana meditation."

== Biography ==
Sam Bunthoeun was born close to Phnom Penh in Kandal province in 1957. He was ordained in 1980.

During these years, Sam Bunthoeun may have been initiated to the traditional meditations techniques, as studied by Francois Bizot, which included esoteric teachings and master and disciple transmission, before the Khmer Rouge wiped them out. From 1976 to 1979, San Bunthoen was forcibly defrocked like almost all other monks in Cambodia.

Along with Tep Vong, he was reordained as a monk in 1979. In 1995, the annual buddhist council formally validated the importance of vipassana meditation and called Sam Bunthoeun to propagate it from Phnom Penh. The latter settled at Wat Nuntamony in 1995 and acquired land near Phnom Attaraq in Oudong to set up his meditation center. The transfer of the relics of Buddha which had been kept in front of the Royal railway station in Phnom Penh to the top of the mountain in Oudong made his new center "one of the more cosmologically central locations in the country."

On February 6, 2003, Sam Bunthoeun was fatally shot outside Wat Langka by two men on a motorcycle. He was struck by two bullets to his chest, and died two days later at Calmette Hospital at age 47.

His body was lain in state in a refrigerated glass case the center in Oudong for years. Almost 14 years after he was gunned down in Phnom Penh, Sam Bunthoeun was finally cremated over the weekend in a three-day ceremony in Kandal province that attracted hundreds of thousands of mourners in December 2014.

== Contribution: bringing peace both inside and outside ==
=== Vipassana: meditation as the way to inner peace ===
Sam Bunthoeun is especially remembered in Cambodia today as one of the main promoters of the Khmer tradition of meditation known as a vipassana. He opposed ritual blessings with water (sraouch toeuk) as a mere exterior purification and suggested meditation was a better way to inner peace and purification. Sam Bunthoeun founded and headed the Buddhist Meditation Center of Oudong. By 2005, there were 300 donchees and 100 monks present at this center, making one of the largest meditation centers in Cambodia.

Sam Bunthoeun renewed the Cambodian practice of meditation in the 1990s in collaboration with Chheng Phon, former Minister of Culture, who set up his own meditation center as a lay man, and Preah Maha Ghosananda, whose dhammayietra was conceived as a walking meditation. Another Khmer-American monk, Pou Tonghav, would introduce the vipassana technique which he had learned from S. N. Goenka in the United States and India. More conservative monks such as Daung Phang have criticized this proliferation of vipassana seminars in Cambodia as "foreign" and contrary to traditional Khmer praying techniques.

After his untimely death, other monks and Buddhist laymen have continued to promote vipassana. Kou Sopheap and Noem Chunny are two of the main proponents of this school of meditation.

=== Assassination: an outspoken defender of peace in Cambodian politics? ===
It has been speculated that Sam Bunthoeun's assassination may have been linked to the political situation in Cambodia, one week after the anti-Thai 2003 Phnom Penh riots. Since 2002, a group of Thai monks had set up their Dhammakaya Foundation in Phnom Penh following the Dhammakaya meditation school of Thai vipassana master Luang Pu Sodh Candasaro. Some have also argued that Sam Bunthoeun may have been too critical of Tep Vong's ban on voting in public elections for Buddhist monks. Graham Watson, a member of the European Parliament at that time, said at a press conference in Phnom Penh that the killing was “no doubt an attempt to intimidate Buddhist monks against registering for the election.” His assassination also took place two weeks before the assassination of Funcinpec adviser and lawmaker Om Radsady. Others have said that Sam Bunthoen was not an politically outspoken figure. Instead, those argue that the killing could have been motivated either financially by the change in contractors for the building of his new center in Oudong or romantically from the jealousy of the husband of one of his female devotees.
