= Khieu Chum =

Cambodian Buddhist monk

Dhammapālabhikkhu Khieu Chum ធម្មបាលភក្ខុ ខៀវ ជុំ
- Title: Dhammapālabhikkhu

Personal life
- Born: 1907 S'ang District, Kandal Province, French Cambodia
- Died: 1975, age 68 Langka Temple, Phnom Penh, Cambodia
- Occupation: Buddhist Monk

Religious life
- Religion: Buddhism
- School: Theravada
- Dharma name: Dhammapāla

Khieu Chum (Khmer: ខៀវ ជុំ Khmer pronunciation: [kʰiəw cum], 1907–1975) was a prominent Cambodian Buddhist monk and activist who was a member of a small group of people responsible for planning the Cambodian coup of 1970 which overthrew the monarchy and placed General Lon Nol as leader of a new Khmer Republic. After Cambodia achieved independence in 1953, Chum became an active figure in internal politics and is now considered one of the country's most significant political thinkers of the era.

== Biography ==
=== An ordinary Khmer peasant aspiring to become an intellectual monk ===
Khieu Chum was born in S'ang District in the Province of Kandal. His year of birth is believed to be the year 1907 according to Cambodian Buddhist sources, rather than 1915, which is impossible as he was younger than Pang Khat who was born in 1910. His parents were both ordinary Khmer peasants.

He entered the Buddhist monkhood and went to study of Wat Langka under the abbot Lvea Em.

=== From the Umbrella revolution to prison in exile on Poulo Condor ===
In 1942, Khieu Chom joined the Umbrella Revolution along with other nationalist monks such as Hiem Chieu in Phnom Penh who were opposed to the French protectorate. With his comrades Pang Khat and others, he was sent to jail and deported to Poulo Condor island. All these political prisoners were released at the end of the Second World War and Khieu Chom returned to his studies as a monk in Wat Langka.

As he returned, he continued to speak boldly with sermons that went beyond the traditional realm of Buddhist devotion into the realm of science, economics and politics. He was critical of certain traits of Khmer character and of lasting misunderstandings such as the selfless charity of Vessantara, which he presumed was one of the reason for the poverty of Khmer peasants.

=== A "Thanhist" under the Khmer Republic ===
In 1970, Khieu Chom was ordained as the abbot of Wat Langka by Supreme Patriarch Huot That, a position which he kept until his assassination in 1975.

After the coup which capsized the Khmer Monarchy and installed a short-lived Khmer Republic led by Lon Nol and supported by the American government, Khieu Chum gained even more importance as a political monk at a time when he reach "the zenith of his career." Some even presume that he was "a member of a small group of people responsible for planning the Cambodian coup of 1970 which overthrew the monarchy." While he was supportive of the Republic and helped drafting the republican constitution, his conservative views were at odds with many policies imposed by Lon Nol. As such, he was considered a "Thanist", as he was a partisan of Son Ngoc Thanh. The committee he led in early March 1971 in presence of Lon Nol led to the dismissal of Sirik Matak and his replacement by Son Ngoc Thanh.

Most of all, Khieu Chum was critical of the instrumentalization of the Buddhism for political ends but he himself wrote some speeches for Lon Nol and regularly justified the end the monarchy on Buddhist grounds during his speeches broadcast on national radio. He was even criticized by Huot That as a revolutionary. Cronyism and association with the Republican government was severely judged by the Khmers Rouges once they entered Phnom Penh in April 1975, leading to his execution with other monks for alleged “CIA” sympathies and “enemy” activities.”

== Legacy ==
=== A figurehead of Cambodian Buddhism republicanism ===
Chum was a student of Hem Chieu, a leading figure in the early period of modern Khmer nationalism. He is also credited with writing the March of the Khmer Republic. He is most notiours for arguing that the Buddhist religion should not depend on monarchical structures. Khieu Chum interpreted the Great Renunciation as a rejection of the monarchy by the Buddha.

Khieu Chum's commitment to republicanism represents the fusion of Buddhism and the political.

— Todd Lewis, Teaching Buddhism: New Insights on Understanding and Presenting the Traditions

=== A Khmer linguist ===
Inspired from the work of Khmer linguists Ieu Koeus and Keng Vannsak, Khieu Chum also encouraged the renewal of Cambodian identity through a deeper knowledge of Khmer language. In 1962, he published a Khmer grammar which he complemented in 1966 with another manual, Our Grammar (Khmer: វេយ្យករណ៍យើង).

=== A spiritual fighter ===
In 1969, Khieu Chum wrote what is believed to be his spiritual legacy: Life is a Struggle (Khmer: ជីវិតតស៊ូ) where he showed that beyond his personal struggles and the toil of the Cambodian people, the character of the Khmer people would allow them to carry on. Two posthumous books of his were reprinted in 2001: Life is peace (ជីវិតសន្តិភាព) and The Problem of Life (បណ្ហាជីវិត). Buddhist novices in Cambodia still read these philosophical books for personal development as they have become classics in Cambodian literature.

== Bibliography ==
- Ian Harris, "The Monk and the King: Khieu Chum and Regime Change in Cambodia.” Udaya: Journal of Khmer Studies 9 (2008).
