= Suzanne Karpelès =

French Indologist (1890–1968)

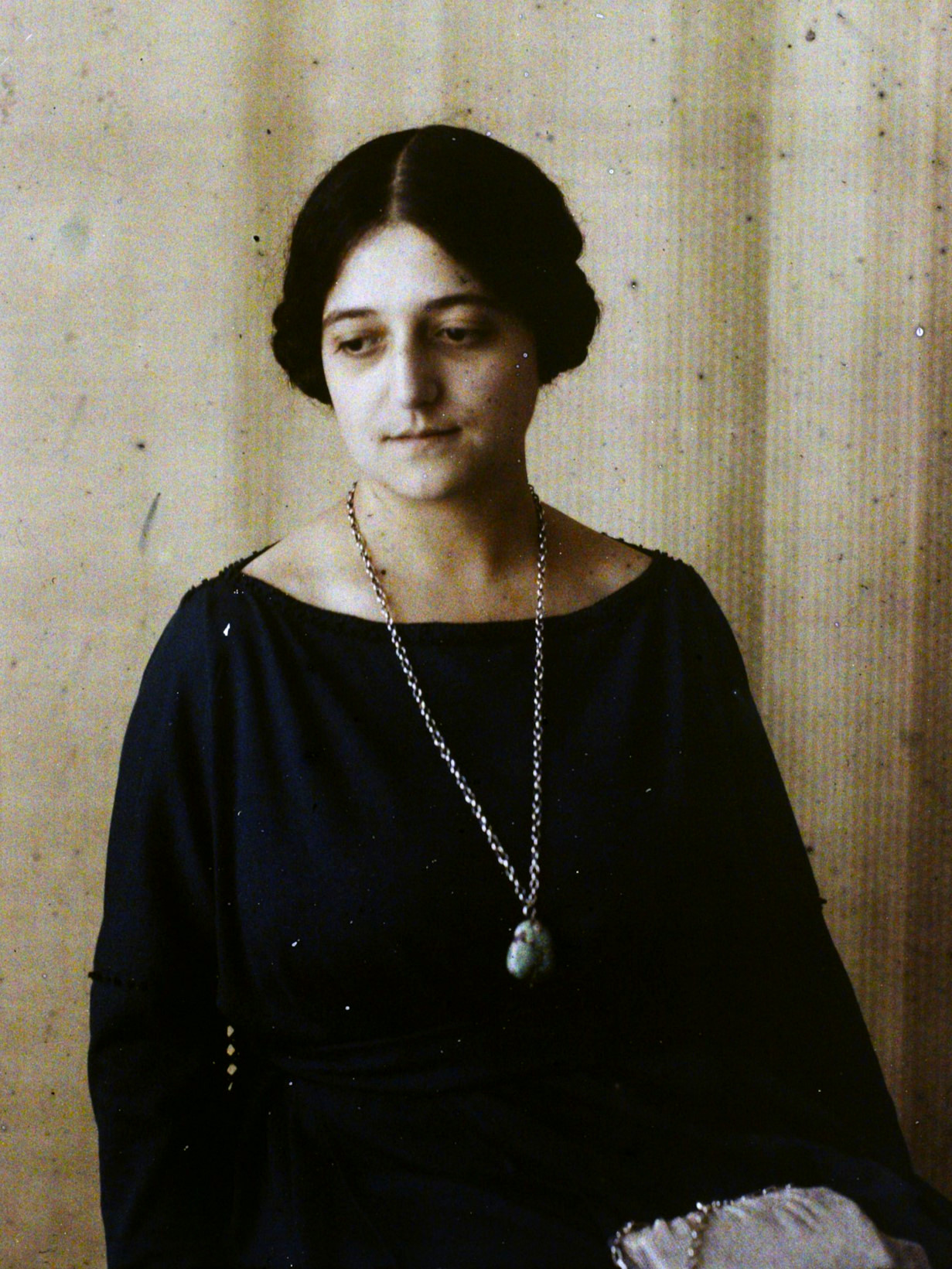
- Autochrome portrait by Auguste Léon, 1920
- Born: 17 March 1890; Paris, France
- Died: 7 November 1968 (aged 78); Pondicherry, India
- Education: École pratique des hautes études
- Alma mater: École orientales, École Pratique des Hautes Études
- Occupations: Indologist, Buddhist scholar
- Years active: 1917–1968
- Employer: French School of the Far East
- Known for: Conservation and cataloguing of Cambodian Buddhist texts; founding Secretary-General of the Buddhist Institute of Cambodia
- Notable work: Lokeçvaraçataka (translation, 1919); French translation of the Dhammapada (1960)

Suzanne Karpelès (17 March 1890 – 7 November 1968) was a French Indologist, who was a multilingual specialist in the languages and cultures of colonized French Indochina. She was the first curator of the Royal Library of Phnom Penh and suggested the founding of the Buddhist Institute of Cambodia where she served as the first secretary-general.

== Biography ==
Karpelès was born in Paris into a wealthy family of Hungarian Jews and grew up in Pondicherry on the east coast of the Indian peninsula which was a French colonial territory at that time.

=== Education ===
In 1917 Paris, Karpelès was the first woman to graduate from the École orientales (oriental school) of the École Pratique des Hautes Études, where she studied eastern cultures and languages including, Sanskrit, Pali, Nepali, Tibetan language and Tibetan religion. There her teachers included the scholars Sylvain Lévi, Alfred Foucher and Louis Finot, and she graduated after publishing her translation of the Buddhist Sanskrit and Tibetan text Lokeçvaraçataka in 1919 in the Asian Journal.

Karpelès was the first female member of the École française d’Extrême-Orient (EFEO), with a posting in 1922 to Hanoi (then part of French Indochina, now Vietnam) followed by an appointment to Phnom-Penh (now Cambodia) in 1925. As soon as she arrived there, she began collating the Sri Lankan manuscript in the Pāḷi language, called the Kanikhâvitaranî, with a Khmer language version. Then, in 1923, she was sent to Bangkok, Thailand, to compare her work to another manuscript of the same text to improve her facility with the Thai language.

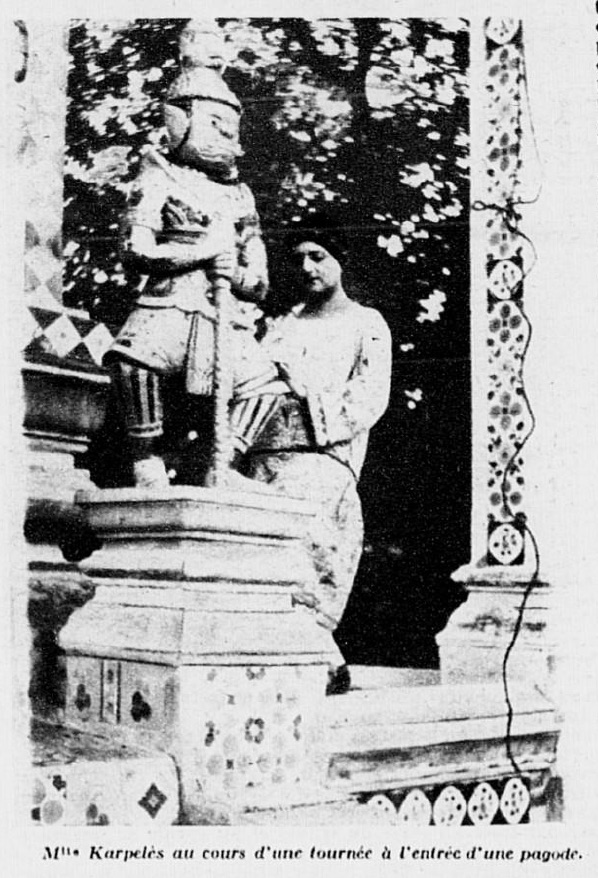
Karpelès, 1932

=== Life in Cambodia ===
In 1925 in Phnom Penh, the King of Cambodia made Karpelès the first curator of his newly founded Royal Library. In that position, her first tasks were to collect, classify, preserve and publicize the library's treasures. To expand public knowledge of the library's holdings even more, in 1929, she suggested the establishment of a new institution dedicated to the study of Buddhism. Founded jointly by both Cambodia and Laos in 1930 as the Buddhist Institute of Cambodia, she was named its first secretary-general. The Royal Library of Phnom Penh (now the National Library) and a similar royal library created at the same time in Luang Prabang, Laos, were both chartered with very specific missions: to collect and conserve existing texts.

Karpelès's scope of work expanded greatly. She became the chief publications officer for the École Supérieure de Pāli, and she also enabled regular broadcasts of programs about Buddhism on state radio. She published the country's first Buddhist periodical, started a mobile library project and arranged for the distribution of the Tipiṭaka (the Pāli Canon) in Khmer script to every monastery in the Cambodia.

With the start of World War II in 1940, Karpelès was one of 15 Jews living in Cambodia who were forced from their employment by the pro-Nazi Vichy-French government. She was reinstated when the war ended. From that time until her retirement, she traveled between France and Cambodia, "continuing to make important contributions to Buddhism."

=== Influencer ===
Because Karpelès worked with the young religious monks of Cambodia to help them improve their knowledge of Buddhism as well as their culture, she was able to shape the work of the country's future leaders. According to EFEO sources, "She exerted a considerable influence on the intellectual formation of two successors to the position of Supreme Patriarch of Cambodia" — the Venerable Chhuon Nath (in office 1948–1969) and the Venerable Huot Tat (1969–1975).

=== Last years ===
In all, she was known to communicate in multiple languages including: French, Sanskrit, Pali, Nepali, Tibetan, Thai and Khmer. Among her later efforts were French translations of the Dhammapada published in 1960 and her work in 1961 on Nyanatiloka's Buddhist Dictionary.

After retiring, Karpelès moved close to Pondicherry (which by that time had become part of India when French colonialism ended) into the Sri Aurobindo ashram, where she taught French language and literature. She died in Pondicherry on 7 November 1968.

== Memberships ==
- Member, Association of Friends of the Orient.
- Member, French School of the Far East, from 1922 to 1925 and again from 1936 to 1941. (She was a corresponding member from 1926 to 1936.)
- Corresponding member of the 5th section of the Academy of Colonial Sciences, 1929.

== Selected publications ==
- 1919: “Lokeçvaraçataka or Hundred stanzas in honor of the Lord of the World by Vajradatta," JA 14, p. 357-465.
- 1919: A finger from the moon. Hindu love story, (translated from English), Paris, Grasset, 297 p.
- 1924: “Six Pali tales taken from the Dhammapadatthakatha," Revue Indochinoise 1-2, p. 1-30; 3–4, p. 205-234; 5–6, p. 323-350; 7–8, p. 11-44.
- 1925: “An episode of the Siamese Ramayana,” in Asian Studies 1, Paris, G. van Oest (PEFEO 19), p. 315-342.
- 1928: “An example of Indo-Khmer sculpture," Indian Art and Letters, ns 2/1, p. 28.
- 1934: "Sisters beggars, brothers beggars of Buddhist doctrine, Stanzas translated from Pali," Far Asia (Saigon) 91 (not paginated)
- 1948: “A case of international maritime law in 1797,” BSEI 'ns 23 / 3-4, p. 125-131.
- 1948-1949: Initiation to the history of Hindu art, Hanoi, EFEO courses and conferences, 66 leaflets.
- 1949: “Notes on a manuscript relating to a Burmese embassy in Cochinchina,” BSEI ns 24/1, p. 3-11.
