= Dharampal Saini =

Indian educationist and social activist

Dharam Pal Saini
- Born: 24 जून 1930; Dhar, Madhya Pradesh, India
- Occupations: Farmer, Educator
- Awards: Padma Shri, 1992

Dharam Pal Saini in an Indian educationist and social activist who was awarded Padma Shri, the fourth highest civilian award in India, in 1995 for educating tribal girls in Bastar. In 2021, Saini played a key role in securing the release of a COBRA commando Rakeshwar Singh Manhas from Naxalists post 2021 Sukma-Bijapur attack. Saini runs Mata Rukmani Devi Ashram's residential schools, whose tribal girl students have won several national sports events.
