= Sylvain Lévi =

French orientalist and indologist (1863–1935)

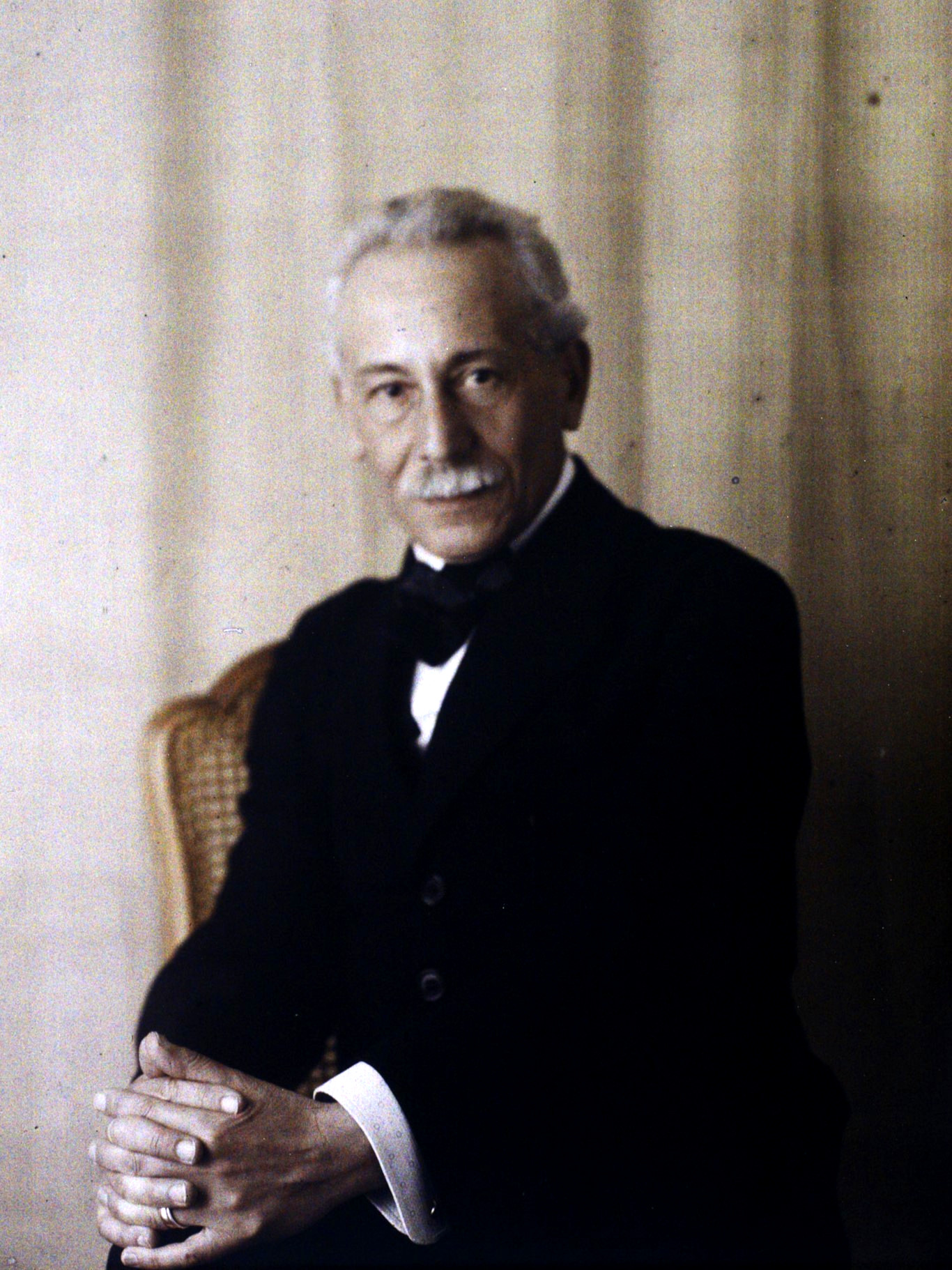
- Autochrome by Auguste Léon, 1920
- Born: March 28, 1863; Paris, France
- Died: October 30, 1935 (aged 72); Paris, France
- Scientific career
- Fields: Sanskrit language, literature, Buddhism
- Institutions: Collège de France
- Notable students: Paul Demiéville, Paul Pelliot, Marcel Mauss

Sylvain Lévi (French: [silvɛ̃ levi]; March 28, 1863 – October 30, 1935) was an influential French intellectual and author whose specialities were oriental studies and India. He taught Sanskrit and Indian religions at the École pratique des hautes études in Paris, France. One of his notable students was Paul Pelliot.

Lévi's book Théâtre Indien is an important work on the subject of Indian performance art, and Lévi also conducted some of the earliest analysis of Tokharian fragments discovered in Western China. Lévi exerted a significant influence on the life and thought of Marcel Mauss, the nephew of Émile Durkheim.

Sylvain Lévi was a co-founder of the École française d'Extrême-Orient in Hanoi.

According to the Universal Jewish Encyclopedia, Lévi was (one of the) founder(s) of the École française d'Extrême-Orient (EFEO) (French School of the Far East) in Hanoi. The École française d'Extrême-Orient's website notes that the school was founded in Hanoi in 1902. One of his students, Suzanne Karpelès, the first female member of EFEO, joined him there in 1922 and remained in French Indochina until 1941.

== Opinions ==
He was also an early opponent of the traditionalist author René Guénon, citing the latter's uncritical belief in a "perennial philosophy", that a primal truth revealed directly to primitive humanity, based on an extreme reductionist view of Hinduism, which was the subject of Guénon's first book, L'Introduction générale a l'étude des doctrines hindoues. That was a thesis delivered to Lévi at the Sorbonne and rejected.

== Works ==
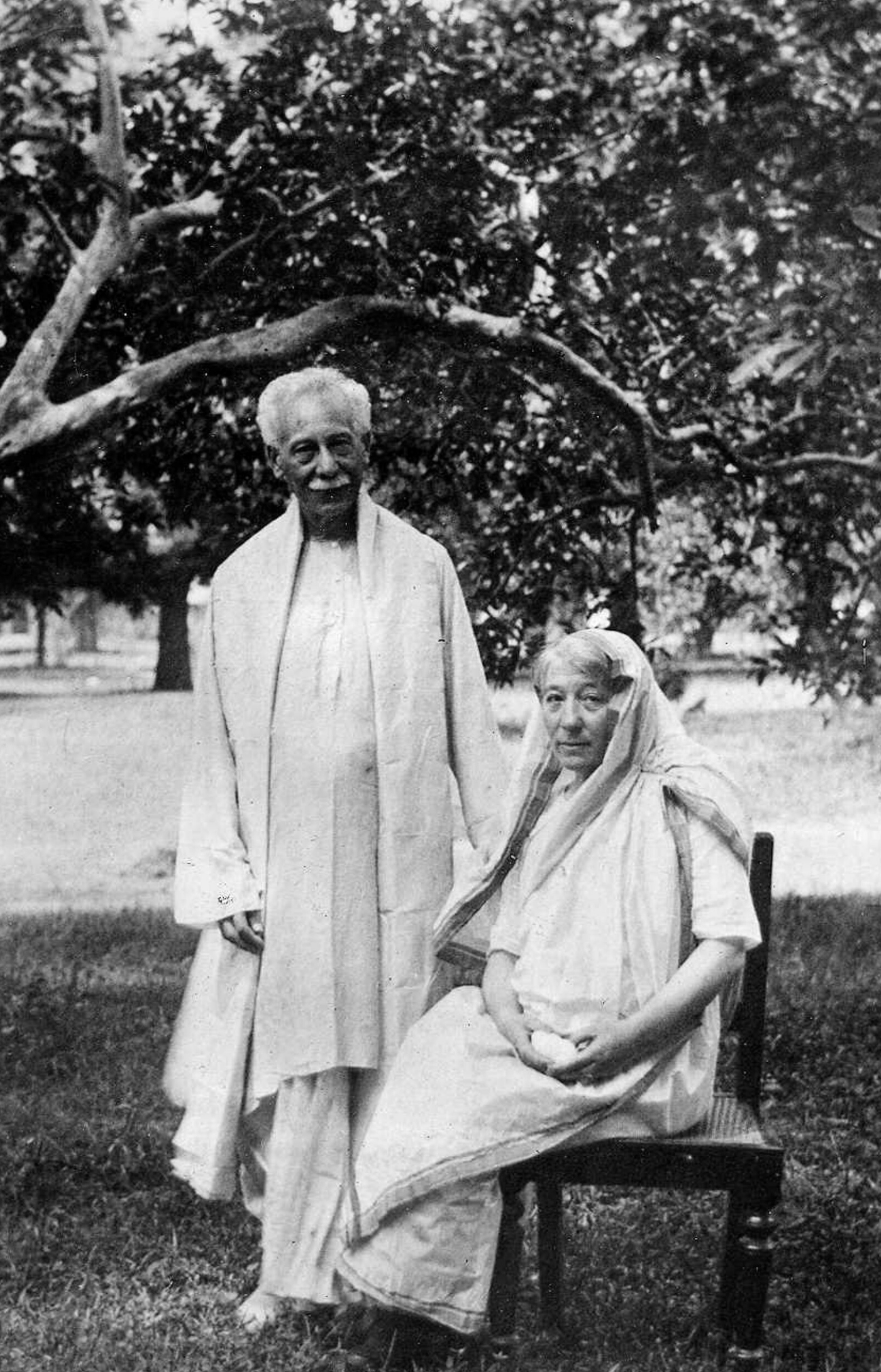
Lévi and his wife at Shantiniketan, India

- Le Théâtre Indien, Deuxième tirage, 1963, Publié à l'occasion du centenaire de la naissance de Sylvain Lévi, Bibliothèque de l'Ecole des Hautes Etudes, IV^{e} section, 83^{e} Fascicule, Paris, Distributeur exclusif: Librairie Honoré Champion.
- Lévi, S. 1898. La doctrine du sacrifice dans les Brâhmanas, Paris : Ernest Leroux, Bibliothèque de l’École des Hautes Études-Sciences religieuses [= BÉHÉ-SR], vol. 11.
- Lévi, S. 1966. Id., avec une préface de L. Renou, 2e éd., Paris : Presses Universitaires de France, BÉHÉ-SR, vol. 73.
- Lévi, S. 2003. Id., réimpr. de Lévi 1966, avec une postface inédite de Ch. Malamoud, Brepols : Turnhout, BÉHÉ-SR, vol. 118.
- Le Népal: Étude historique d’un royaume hindou, Sylvain Lévi, 3 vol. 1905–08, Paris
- Nepal: Historical study of a Hindu kingdom, Sylvain Levi, Ancient Nepal, 44 installments, 1973–90.
- Asvaghosa, le sutralamkara et ses sources, S. Lévi, JA, 1908, 12, p. 57-193
- Autour d'Asvaghosa, Sylvain Lévi, JA, Oc-Déc. 1929, p. 281-283
- Kanishka et Satavahana, Sylvain Lévi, JA, Jan–Mars 1936, p. 103-107
- Le Bouddhisme et les Grecs, S. Lévi, R.H.R. 23 (1891), p. 37
- L'énigme des 256 nuits d'Asoka, Sylvain Lévi, JA 1948, p. 143-153
- Les études orientales, par Sylvain Lévi, Annales du musée Guimet numéro 36, Hachette 1911, ANU DS1.P32.t36
- Les grands hommes dans l'histoire de l'Inde, par Sylvain Lévi, Annales du musée Guimet numéro 40, Hachette 1913, ANU A DS1.P32.t40
- Les seize Arhats protecteurs de la loi, Sylvain Lévi et Édouard Chavannes, JA 1916, vol. II, p. 204-275
- Le sutra du sage et du fou, Sylvain Lévi, JA, Oc-Déc. 1925, p. 320-326, ANU pBL1411.A82.L4
- L'inde civilisatrice, aperçu historique, S. Lévi, Paris 1938
- L'Inde et le Monde, par Sylvain Lévi, Honoré Champion 1926, ANU G B131.L4
- Madhyantavibhangatika, tr. S. Lévi ?, ANU BQ2965.Y3
- Mahayanasutralamkara, exposé de la doctrine du Grand Véhicule selon le système Yogachara, tr. française Sylvain Lévi, Librairie Honoré Champion, 5 Quai Malaquais, Paris 1911, réimpression Rinsen Book Co. Kyoto 1983 (ISBN 4-653-00951-1) ANU BQ3002.L48.1983.t2
- Maitreya, le consolateur, S. Lévi, Mélanges Linossier, II, pp. 362–3 & pp. 355–402
- Matériaux pour l'étude du système Vijnaptimatra, Sylvain Lévi, Paris Chanmpion 1932
- Nairatmyapariprccha, Sylvain Lévi, JA, Oct-Déc. 1928, p. 209-215
- Notes indiennes, Sylvain Lévi, JA, Janv. Mars 1925, p. 26-35
- Notes sur les manuscrits sanscrits provenant de Bamiyan et de Gilgit, S. Lévi
- Observations sur une langue précanonique du bouddhisme, S. Lévi, JA Nov-Déc. 1912, p. 511
- Sur la récitation primitive des textes bouddhiques, Sylvain Lévi, JA, Mai-Juin 1915, p. 401-407
- Une langue précanonique du bouddhisme, S. Lévi, JA 1912, p. 495-514
- Vijnaptimatratasiddhi, Sylvain Lévi, Paris 1925, ANU AA BL1405.B8
- Vimsika-Vimsatika de Vasubandhu, tr. S. Lévi, Bibliothèque de l'École des Hautes Etudes fascicule 245-1925 et 260-1932 Paris
- JA = Journal Asiatique

== Sources ==
- Louis Renou (1996). Mémorial Sylvain Lévi. Éd. Motilal Banarsidass Publ. ISBN 9788120813434
- Lyne Bansat-Boudon; Roland Lardinois; Isabelle Ratié (2007), Sylvain Lévi (1863-1935) : études indiennes, histoire sociale: actes du colloque tenu à Paris les 8-10 octobre 2003, Turnhout: Brepols
- Goloubew, Victor (1935). Sylvain Lévi et l'Indochine, Bulletin de l'École française d'Extrême-Orient 35 (1), 550-574
- Bloch, Jules (1937). Sylvain Lévi, École pratique des hautes études, Section des sciences historiques et philologiques 70 (1), 39-43
