= Dharmapala (disambiguation) =

Dharmapala is a Sanskrit name which means "protector of the Dharma". The Pāli equivalent is Dhammapala. The name is often used by Buddhists to refer to a variety of persons and concepts, including:

== Buddhism ==
- Anagarika Dharmapala (1864–1933), a 19th-century Sri Lankan Buddhist activist who founded Maha Bodhi Society
- Dharmapala, a type of supernatural being in Vajrayana Buddhism
- Dhammapala, name of a number of great Theravada Buddhist commentators
- Dharmapala of Nalanda (530–561), one of the great scholars of the Yogācāra school

== Rulers ==
- Dharmapala (emperor) (ruled 8th century), one of the most powerful rulers of the Pala Empire of Bengal
- Dharma Pala (1035–1060), king of Kamarupa in northeastern India
- Dharmapala Kamboja (11th century), a Kamboja ruler of Kamboja-Pala Dynasty of Bengal
- Dharmapala of Kotte (1541–1597), a Sri Lankan ruler of Kingdom of Kotte, who converted to Christianity
- Dharmapala of Nalanda (530–561), 6th-century Indian Buddhist scholar of Yogachara at Nalanda
- Dharmapala, an ancient Kamboja ruler of Kamboja Kingdom, according to Sthala Purana

== Others ==
- A. W. Dharmapala, a pioneering broadcaster of Radio Ceylon
- Dharampal (1922–2006), Indian historian of colonial India
- Dharampal Gulati or Mahashay Dharampal Gulati (1923–2020), Indian businessman, founder of the spice company MDH (Mahashian Di Hatti)
- Dharampal Lakra, Indian politician from the Aam Aadmi Party, member of the 7th Delhi Legislative Assembly
- Dharampal Saini, Indian educationist and activist for tribal rights
- Dharampal Singh, Indian politician from the Bahujan Samaj Party in Uttar Pradesh, member of the 16th Legislative Assembly of India
- Dharampal Singh Gudha, Indian marathon runner

== See also ==
- Dharma (disambiguation)
- Pala (disambiguation)
- Dharampal Satyapal Group, an Indian conglomerate
