= S'ang District =

S'ang ស្រុកស្អាង
- District (srok)
- Location in Cambodia
- Coordinates: 11°21′45″N 105°0′18″E
- Country: Cambodia
- Province: Kandal
- Communes: 16
- Villages: 119

Population (1998)
  - Total: 169,792
- Time zone: +7
- Geocode: 0810

S'ang (Khmer: ស្រុកស្អាង) is a district (srok) of Kandal Province, Cambodia. The district is subdivided into 12 communes (khum) such as Khpob, Kaoh Khael, Kaoh Khsach Tonlea, Krang Yov, Prasat, Preaek Ambel, Preaek Koy, S'ang Phnum, Svay Prateal, Ta Lon, Traeuy Sla, Tuek Vil and 119 villages (phum).

== Administration ==
Code Commune	Name Commune English	Name Commune Khmer
081001	Khpob Commune	ឃុំខ្ពប
081003	Kaoh Khael Commune	ឃុំកោះខែល
081004	Kaoh Khsach Tonlea	ឃុំកោះខ្សាច់ទន្លា
081005	Krang Yov	ឃុំក្រាំងយ៉ូវ
081006	Prasat	ឃុំប្រាសាទ
081007	Preaek Ambel	ឃុំព្រែកអំបិល
081008	Preaek Koy	ព្រែកគយ
081010	S'ang Phnum	ឃុំស្អាងភ្នំ
081012	Svay Prateal	ឃុំស្វាយប្រទាល
081014	Ta Lon	ឃុំតាលន់
081015	Traeuy Sla	ឃុំត្រើយស្លា
081016	Tuek Vil	ឃុំទឹកវិល
