= Kou Sopheap =

Cambodian Buddhist monk

Kou Sopheap is a Cambodian Buddhist monk of the Mohanikay sect.

== Biography ==
Kou Sopheap was born during the Cambodian Civil War to a family of ordinary Khmer peasants in the rural area of Ou Reang Ov, currently in the Province of Tboung Khmum.

Kou Sopheap is a teaching professor of personal growth and development at Pannasastra University of Cambodia.

After the passing of charismatic Khmer Buddhist leaders such as Maha Ghosananda, Kou Sopheap is part of a new generation of post-war Buddhist monks. While some have argued for a total collapse of Buddhism in Cambodia during the dark ages of the Khmer rouge, Kou Sopheap believes that “during Pol Pot regime Buddhism apparently disappeared from the land of Cambodia, but in the hearts of the people it never disappeared [and] that is why, after the regime fell, Buddhism came back."

While the access to psychological support service remains difficult in Cambodia, Kou Sopheap, with his training in psychology, has developed an online platform through social networks to teach Cambodian people "about life issues and how to overcome them". For that reason, in April 2019, he was invited as a speaker at the first ever TED Conference in Cambodia, under the theme “Mindful living key to strengthening life”, explaining how the anxiety of young people of today leads to depression and suicidal tendencies.

Since 2019, Kou Sopheap has partnered with the Minister for the Environment, in various projects such as the protection of Prey Lang Wildlife Sanctuary.

During the Coronavirus pandemic, Kou Sopheap encouraged Buddhists to find alternate ways to honor the departed such as domestic celebrations while government restrictions did not allow Cambodian people to properly honour the dead.

Since August 2021, Kou Sopheap in partnership with WB Finance has led SOBOROS, a charity investment fund with collaborative charity partners such as The Cambodia Kantha Bopha Foundation, Cambodian Children’s Fund, Don Bosco Foundation of Cambodia International, Angkor Hospital for Children, and Dhamma Osatha Foundation.

Kou Sopheap is often invited to preach sermons and offer blessings at various events such as student fairs, art shows, charitable distributions with partners such as the Cambodian Red Cross led by Bun Rany,

== Contribution ==
=== A Buddhist Ecology ===
Whereas some scholars have criticized a lack of environmental concern in Buddhism, Kou Sopheap strives to share Buddha’s teachings and philosophy of taking the middle path and giving back in order to revamp Cambodia’s food ecosystem vital. In line with human ecology, Kou Sopheap argues that protecting the environment starts by protecting oneself and one's loved ones. Kou Sopheap has encouraged the younger generations to have "strong moral values" to foster family as the fundamental structure of society while he has expressed concerns of rising rate of family crime in Cambodia.

=== Encouraging the spiritual life of the upāsaka ===
In the footsteps of Sam Bunthoeun, Kou Sopheap has been a staunch promoter of vipassana meditation in Cambodia. Meditation for the Energy of Life “សមាធិ ដើម្បីថាមពលជីវិត”, the book co-authored by Kou Sopheap and Noem Chhunny, was first publish in 2019 and the second printed in 2021 in Khmer language. The book shared about meditation, Buddha's teaching, and mindfulness that serve as the wisdom energy for the mental health and peace of mind.

== Bibliography ==
- សុភាព, គូ; នឹម, ឈុន្នី (2019). សមាធិដើម្បីថាមពលជីវិត. Image Printing. ISBN 978-9924-9270-0-6. OCLC 1286084679.
