= Louis Finot (archaeologist) =

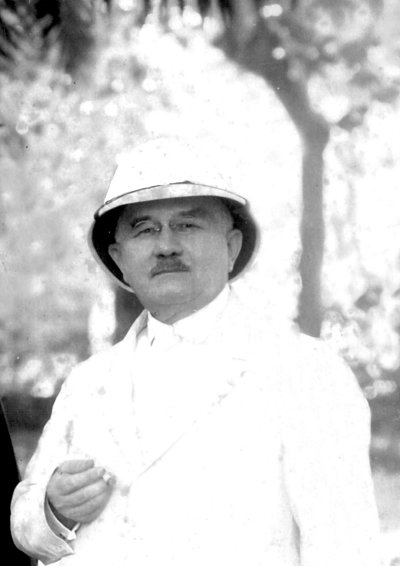
Louis Finot

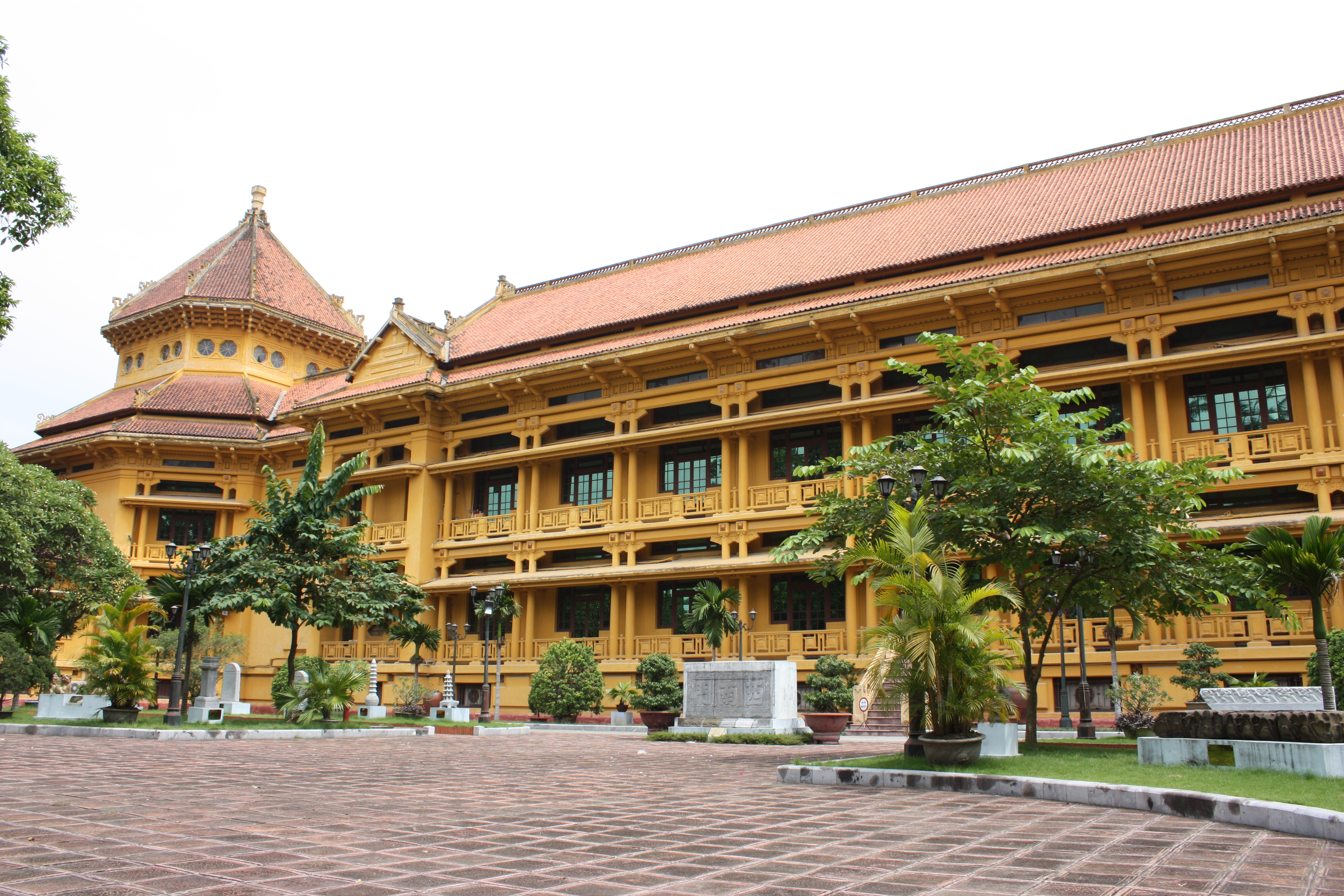
Site of the original École française d'Extrême-Orient (later named Musee Louis Finot) in Hanoi, Vietnam, now the National Museum of Vietnamese History

Louis Finot (20 July 1864 – 16 May 1935) was a French archaeologist and orientalist whose research included Indian and Southeast Asian history, languages, inscriptions, and architecture. He was the first director of the École française d'Extrême-Orient (EFEO) and later held academic posts at the École pratique des hautes études and the Collège de France.

Finot studied law and literature in Paris before entering the École des Chartes in 1886. He graduated in 1888 as an archivist-palaeographer, after submitting a thesis on the finances of the French crown under Charles VI. He then worked at the Bibliothèque nationale, where he began studying Sanskrit under the influence of the scholar Sylvain Lévi.

In 1898, Finot was appointed director of the archaeological mission in Indochina, which became the EFEO in 1900. He directed the EFEO during several terms and helped establish its research and publishing work, including the *Bulletin de l’École française d’Extrême-Orient*. His research included the languages, inscriptions, religions, and monuments of mainland Southeast Asia.

From 1907 to 1930, Finot taught the history and philology of Indochina at the Collège de France. He also held a teaching post at the École pratique des hautes études. In 1933, he was elected a member of the Académie des Inscriptions et Belles-Lettres. He died in Toulon in 1935.

== Publications ==
- 1896: Les lapidaires indiens, Paris, Émile Bouillon (Bibliothèque de l'École des hautes études), p. 280
- 1901: La religion des Chams d'après des monuments.
- 1904: Noté d'épigraphie indochinoise: Les inscriptions de Mi Son.
- 1916: Notes d'épigraphie indochinoise, Hanoi, Imprimerie d'Extrême-Orient, p. 439
- 1917: Recherches sur la littérature laotienne, BEFEO 17/5, p. 1-219.
- 1921. Archéologie indochinoise and L'ethnographie indochinoise, BEFEO 21/1, p. 43-166 and 167-196.
- 1923: Les questions de Milinda, Milinda-Pañhha. Translated from Pali with introduction and notes, Paris, Bossard (Les classiques de l'Orient, 8).
- 1925: Lokesvara en Indochine, Paris, EFEO/Van Oest, (PEFEO 19), Études Asiatiques (1), p. 227-256, pl. 16-25.
- 1925: Inscriptions d'Angkor, BEFEO 25/3-4, p. 297-407.
- 1926: (with Victor Goloubew and Henri Parmentier), Le temple d'Içvarapura (Banteay Srei, Cambodia), Paris, EFEO (Mémoires archéologiques, 1), 140 p., 72 pl.
- 1928: Nouvelles inscriptions du Cambodge, BEFEO 28/1-2, p. 43-80, pl. 1-5.
- 1929-32: (with V. Goloubew et George Coedès), Le temple d'Angkor Vat, Paris, EFEO (Mémoires archéologiques, 2).
