= Đồng Dương =

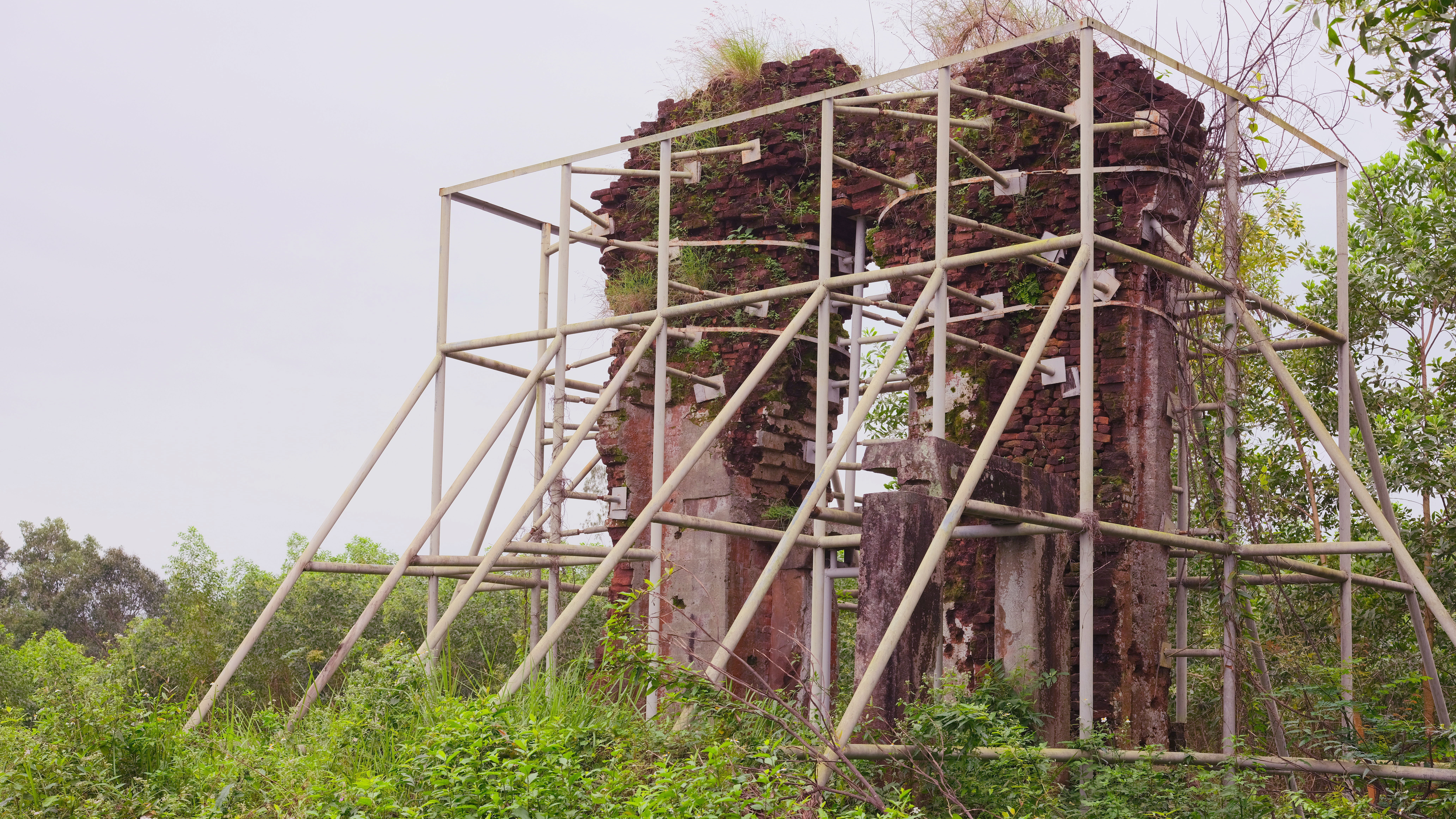
- Đồng Dương ruins
- Interactive map of Đồng Dương
- Coordinates: 15.657061148266365°N 108.2786915282762°E
- Country: Vietnam
- Region: South Central Coast and Central Highlands
- Municipality: Da Nang
- Administrative headquarters: Châu Lâm Hamlet

Area
  - Total: 76.49 km^{2} (29.53 sq mi)

Population (2025)
  - Total: 24,773
  - Density: 323/km^{2} (840/sq mi)
- Website: dongduong.danang.gov.vn

Đồng Dương is a commune in the municipality of Da Nang, Vietnam.

On 16 June 2025:

- District-level administrative units nationwide were dissolved.
- The entire area and population of Bình Lãnh, Bình Trị, and Bình Định communes, formerly part of Thăng Bình district in the former Quảng Nam province, were merged to form a new commune named Đồng Dương.
