= Phadet =

Phadet or Padej (Thai: เผด็จ) is a masculine Thai given name. Notable people with this name include:

- Phadet Phongsawat (born 1940), a Thai Buddhist monk later known as Luang Por Dattajivo
- Padej Khankruea (born 1959), a Thai retired football player known as Piyapong Pue-on
