= Global Buddhist Network =

Thai online television channel

- Type: Satellite network, Cable network (formerly); Internet (currently)
- Country: Thailand
- Availability: worldwide via website and social media
- Owner: Dhamma Research for Environment Foundation
- Launch date: 2002 (sources state different days)
- Dissolved: 2016
- Former names: Dhammakaya Media Channel
- Official website: http://gbnus.com, http://www.dmc.tv

The Global Buddhist Network (GBN), previously known as the Dhammakaya Media Channel (DMC) is a Thai online television channel concerned with Buddhism. The channel's taglines were "The secrets of life revealed" and "The only one", but these were later replaced by "Channel for the path to the cessation of suffering and attainment of Dhamma". The channel features many types of programs with Buddhist content, and has programs in several languages.

The channel started in 2002, as a means to reach remote provinces in Thailand. Controversially, the channel made international headlines in 2012 when it featured a teaching on the afterlife of Steve Jobs. On 26 December 2016, Thai authorities withdrew the permit for the satellite channel permanently, during the legal investigations into the temple by the Thai junta. In April 2017, it was reported, however, that the channel's programming had continued, but broadcast through the Internet only. In its online format, the channel has been renamed Global Buddhist Network.

== Background ==
DMC started in 2002. The channel was owned by the Dhamma Research for Environment Foundation, part of the temple Wat Phra Dhammakaya. The channel was founded to provide an alternative to the many distractions that surround people in modern life, which lure "people into doing immoral things", as stated by Phra Somsak Piyasilo, spokesperson of the organization. The channel originated from an initiative in 2001 when people living in the far provinces of Thailand wanted to listen to the teachings of the temple. The temple therefore provided live teachings through a thousand public telephone lines, through which people could follow the activities. The telephone lines had many restrictions in use, and the temple started to broadcast through a satellite television channel instead. Later, in 2005, the temple developed an online counterpart to the channel.

The channel is managed by Phra Maha Nopon Puññajayo, who supervises a team of thirty volunteers. Previously, it was known by the pun 'the Dhamma satellite' (Thai: จานดาวธรรม). The channel was one of the first widely spread satellite channels in Thailand, described as a form of "positive television" (Thai: สื่อสีขาว, lit. 'white media'). The channel's taglines were "The secrets of life revealed" and "The only one". Although the channel broadcasts over thirty different programs, the soap operas with Buddhist content have been most awarded: in 2008, the channel received an award from the Society for Positive Television in Thailand, and in 2010, it received an award from the National Anti-Corruption Commission—both were given for the edifying effects of the channel's soap operas. However, a more general award was also given by the House of Representatives in 2010.

In 2016, the channel was ordered to shut down and its permit eventually withdrawn permanently when the junta cracked down on Wat Phra Dhammakaya during the Klongchan controversy. The channel was later revived in a new digital format, called GBN, short for Global Buddhist Network, which can only be accessed through the Internet.

== Programming and availability ==
Former logo of the Dhammakaya Media Channel

The main focus of the channel, as described by the temple, is moral education. It has programs for people of different ages. It broadcasts guided meditations, talks, preaching, songs, documentaries, dramas, live events and cartoons twenty-four hours a day. Songs played on the channel are often parody versions of popular songs, in diverse genres, with Buddhist content. They explain Buddhist customs and pay homage to important teachers. The programming is aimed at different age groups and diverse communities: e.g. there is a cartoon series about the Jātaka tales for children. The most popular program is a broadcast of a teaching called Fan Nai Fan, which also includes a guided meditation. Before the 2016 crackdown by the Thai junta, the channel could be watched or listened to for free through satellite television, Internet, cable and radio. In 2005, it was reported that DMC had a hundred thousand viewers. In 2016, the satellite channel could be received in all continents in the world, except for South America. The channel has programs in Thai, English, French, Italian, German, Dutch, Spanish and Portuguese, Polish, Russian, Chinese, Korean, Vietnamese, Mongolian and Japanese, and other's Etc. language.

The channel was also broadcast in public places like temples, hotels and prisons. It sought cooperation with other Buddhist countries as well: the temple has assisted with establishing a Sri Lankan television channel with Buddhist content called Shraddha TV, for which it has made content available for free and hired Sri Lankans to help translate. For some programs Burmese Abhidhamma teachers were consulted.

== Steve Jobs episode ==
In 2012, the temple broadcast a talk by Luang Por Dhammajayo, the then abbot of Wat Phra Dhammakaya, about what happened to Steve Jobs after his death. The talk came as a response to a software engineer of Apple who had sent a letter with questions to the abbot. Luang Por Dhammajayo described how Steve Jobs looked like in heaven. He said that Jobs had been reborn as a deva (heavenly being) living close to his former offices, as a result of the karma of having given knowledge to people. He was a deva with a creative, but angry temperament. The talk was much criticized, and the abbot was accused of pretending to have attained an advanced meditative state and of attempting to outshine other temples. The temple answered the critics, saying that the talk was meant to illustrate principles of karma, not to defame Jobs, nor to fake an advanced state.

Critics such as Phra Paisal Visalo and religion scholar Surapot Taweesak pressed the Supreme Sangha Council, who leads the monastic community in Thailand, to investigate further as to whether Luang Por Dhammajayo had fraudulent intentions. Surapot, known for his libertarian views on separation of religion and state, was criticized by sociologist Kengkit Kitirianglap and others, however, for abandoning his libertarian position. With regard to the teaching about Steve Jobs, Kengkit argued that the state, of which the council is part, should not get involved in what is "true Buddhism" and what is not. Surapot replied that urging the council to crack down on Luang Por Dhammajayo does not go against democratic principles, because the monastic discipline applies to all monks equally.

== Shutdown ==
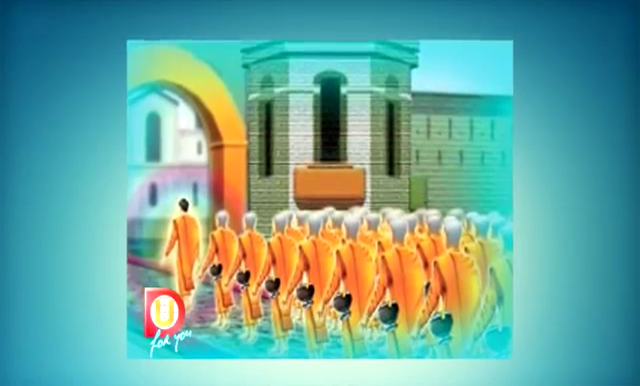
Program about the life of the Buddha

In 2014, Wat Phra Dhammakaya came under scrutiny under the new military junta and in 2015 was implicated in the Klongchan controversy. 11.37 billion baht ($3.6M, €2.9M or £2.6M, as of April 2018) was allegedly embezzled from the Klongchan Credit Union Cooperative, in which a portion totaling over one billion baht was found to have been given to the temple via public donations. The investigations resulted in several failed raids on the temple and the channel was ordered to shut down for thirty days, authorities citing that the channel was used to mobilize people to resist a possible arrest of the former abbot, as people had done during the first raid. The temple appealed to a higher court, denying the accusations and stating that insufficient evidence had been provided. The temple further described the shutdown as an infringement of human rights.

The channel's broadcast permit was permanently withdrawn the same month, on 26 December. Critics compared the shutdown with the military crackdown during the 1992 Black May protest, news outlet Bangkok Post criticizing the National Broadcasting and Telecommunications Commission for "operating outside the courts and justice system". The online channel was still available. Despite the channel being shut down, Thai Rath and other main media outlets have continued to broadcast the temple's ceremonies. The temple has stated that the number of people joining ceremonies has increased since the shutdown, people showing sympathy with the temple and the satellite channel.

== Revival and aftermath ==
On 24 April 2017, a host of the Inside Thailand program on Spring News noticed a revival of the Dhammakaya Media Channel through a new digital format, called GBN, short for Global Buddhist Network. The new tagline of the channel was "Channel for the path to the cessation of suffering and attainment of Dhamma". The channel could be received through the Internet only, and featured very similar contents as before, although the temple's spokesperson assured there would be no further attempts at mobilizing people. Thus, the channel continued in online formats only, through a website and a separate online broadcast. As of 2017, the website ranked 674th of all Thai websites on the Alexa ranking.

The closing down of DMC was not the last time that the junta decided to impose sanctions against a media outlet. In March 2017, the junta closed down Voice TV for seven days, after the channel criticized the martial law imposed on Wat Phra Dhammakaya during the junta's crackdown. And in August the same year, Peace TV was also closed down for a month, the junta citing "it broke the rules of the NCPO". Some reports related this to a policy of removing former PM Thaksin's influence, a policy which has also been connected with Wat Phra Dhammakaya.

== See also ==
- The Buddhist (TV channel)
- Shraddha TV
- Lord Buddha TV
- Voice TV
