= History of Wat Phra Dhammakaya =

History of a Thai Buddhist temple

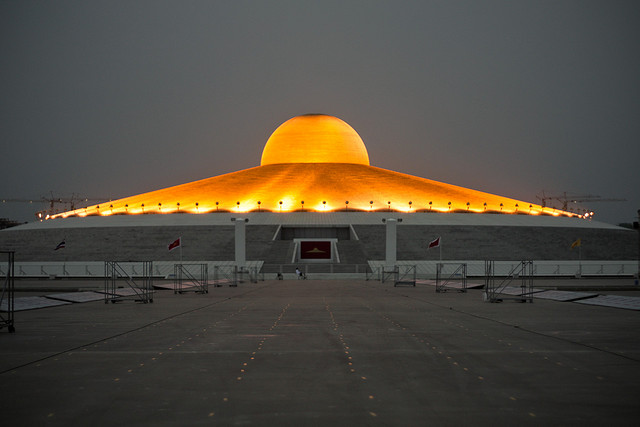
The Dhammakaya Cetiya

Wat Phra Dhammakaya (Thai: วัดพระธรรมกาย) is a Buddhist temple in Thailand. It was founded in 1970 by the maechi (nun) Chandra Khonnokyoong and Luang Por Dhammajayo. The temple's founding has roots in the Dhammakaya tradition founded by Luang Pu Sodh Candasaro at Wat Paknam Bhasicharoen in the early 20th century. Wat Phra Dhammakaya is known for its modern dissemination methods and use of technology.

The temple was initially founded as a meditation center, after Maechi Chandra and the just ordained monk Luang Por Dhammajayo could no longer accommodate the rising number of participants in their activities at Wat Paknam Bhasicharoen, becoming an official temple in 1977. The temple experienced rapid growth during the 1980s, when the temple's programs became widely known among the urban middle class. Wat Phra Dhammakaya expanded its area quickly during this period and started building its iconic stupa (pagoda).

During the period of the 1997 Asian financial crisis, however, the temple was subject to widespread criticism for its fundraising methods and teachings, Luang Por Dhammajayo was eventually charged with embezzlement and removed from his office as abbot. In 2006, the charges were withdrawn and he was restored as abbot. The temple grew further in the following years and became known for its many projects in education, promotion of ethics, and scholarship in Thai society. The temple's tradition developed an international scope, as of 2007, the temple's following was estimated at one million practitioners worldwide and thirty to fifty international centers outside of Thailand.

Under the 2014 military junta, the abbot and the temple were put under scrutiny again and Luang Por Dhammajayo was accused of receiving stolen money of a supporter and money-laundering. This incident led to several standoffs between the temple and the junta, eventually leading to 23 day lock down of the temple in 2017 by the junta that made headlines worldwide. In the aftermath of the lock down the junta stated they will look for Luang Por Dhammajayo elsewhere but continued its scrutiny of the temple, giving the vice abbot, Luang Por Dattajivo several charges as well.

== Founding years (1963–1978) ==
=== First encounters ===
Wat Phra Dhammakaya started with the maechi (nun) Chandra Khonnokyoong. She was a notable student of Luang Pu Sodh Candasaro, when he was still alive. Although illiterate, she was widely respected for her experience in meditation, which is rare for a maechi. She managed to attract many well-educated students, despite her rural background and illiteracy. After Luang Pu Sodh died in 1959, Maechi Chandra transmitted the Dhammakaya tradition to a new generation at Wat Paknam Bhasicharoen. She taught meditation; one of her pupils was a university student called Chaiyabun Sutthiphon. His parents were Lao Song and Thai-Chinese, and separated when he was young. Chaiyabun was raised by his father, who was an engineer working for a government agency. Chaiyabun developed a strong interest in reading, especially in books on Buddhist practice and biographies of leading people in the world, both religious and political, and read about Maechi Chandra in a magazine. In 1963, while enrolled in Kasetsart University, he started visiting Wat Paknam Bhasicharoen. It was here that he first met Maechi Chandra and started to learn meditation with her.

Chaiyabun encouraged his fellow university students to join the activities at Wat Paknam, and the community grew. One of these students was Phadet Phongsawat. In Wat Phra Dhammakaya's biographies, it is told that Phadet often held public demonstrations of black magic (คาถา, ไสยศาสตร์) to his fellow students in his years at Kasetsart University. However, every time Chaiyabun joined to watch one of Phadet's demonstrations, the magic would not work. Phadet therefore became curious, and learnt about Dhammakaya meditation from Chaiyabun. He felt inspired by Chaiyabun's sincerity in meditation and his adherence to the Buddhist five precepts.

=== From Wat Paknam to Wat Phra Dhammakaya ===
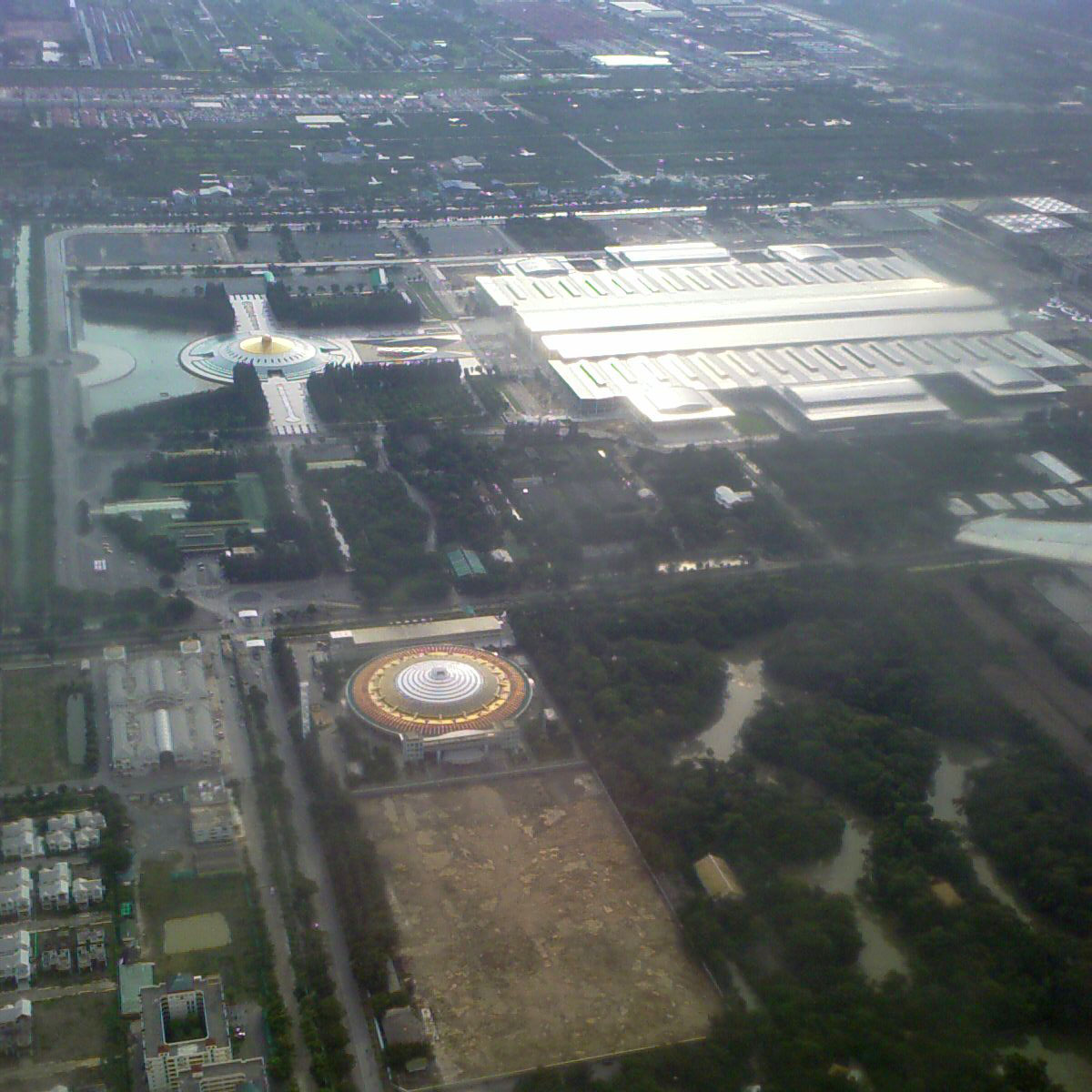
The compound of Wat Phra Dhammakaya: The Dining Hall of Khun yay Archaraya Chandra Khonnokyoong (lower left), The Memorial Hall of Phramongkolthepmuni (upper left) and The Great Sapha Dhammakaya Hall (upper right).

In the beginning, the meditations and teachings were carried out in a small house called "Ban Dhammaprasit" in the compound of Wat Paknam Bhasicharoen. Chaiyabun had set up a group called "Dhammaprasit" and this group had financed the house together in which to organize meditations. Once Chaiyabun was ordained as a monk in 1969 and received the name Phra Dhammajayo, he started teaching Dhammakaya meditation together with Maechi Chandra. Because of the popularity of both teachers, the house soon became overcrowded with interested students and they considered it more appropriate to start a new meditation center by themselves. Although initially they intended to buy a plot of land in Pathum Thani, the landowner Khunying Prayat Suntharawet gave a plot four times the requested size to practice generosity at the occasion of her birthday. On 20 February 1970, Maechi Chandra, Phra Dhammajayo, Phra Dattajivo and their students moved to the 196-rai (313,600 m^{2} or 77.5-acre) plot of land to found a meditation center. Phra Dhammajayo later became abbot of the temple and was called Luang Por Dhammajayo from then on, and Pongsawat was ordained with the name Luang Por Dattajivo and became deputy abbot.

The site, sixteen kilometres (9.9 mi) north of Don Mueang International Airport, was originally called "Sun Phutthachak-patipattham" (ศูนย์พุทธจักรปฏิบัติธรรม). At the time Pathum Thani was well outside Bangkok's northern suburbs. From acidic paddy fields, a woodland was created to be a park for meditation practitioners. The initial budget for construction was very low (3,200 Baht), but despite these economical constraints, the construction of the buildings on the land was able to continue. A book about the initiative was compiled, to inspire people to join in and help. In the accounts of the temple, it is told that the construction happened with great attention for detail. For example, the outside of the wall of the Ubosot was made of gravel that was selected manually. Because the land at first was very acidic, only wattle could be planted. Later on, the soil improved. Though originally the intention was simply to build a center—as a satellite meditation center of Wat Paknam—eventually, this was changed to building a full-fledged temple, under pressure from the authorities who wanted the place to be properly registered. The foundation stone for the Ubosot was laid by Princess Maha Chakri Sirindhorn on behalf of King Bhumibol Adulyadej in December 1977. The following year it was officially recognized as a temple by the Thai government, as "Wat Voranee Dhammakayaram", named after the daughter of Khunying Prayat, Voranee. However, there was disagreement as to who should become the abbot of the temple, and how the temple should develop further: Voranee then stopped supporting the temple. In 1982, the temple therefore left out the daughter's name and renamed itself "Wat Phra Dhammakaya". The main concept of the temple from the start was to be "a school for teaching ethics to society at large", which the founders believed a temple should be.

=== Start of Dhammadayada program ===
In 1972, Wat Phra Dhammakaya started a program called Dhammadayada ('heirs of the Dhamma'), a meditation training program focused on university students. Wat Phra Dhammakaya emphasized youth and young adults in its orientation from its outset. The Buddhist societies of many of Thai universities and colleges were led by supporters of the temple, many coming from the Dhammadayada program, though in the mid-1990s this influence grew weaker. In 1981, the temple also started organizing a contest called 'Path of Progress' (ทางก้าวหน้า). In this program, schools all over Thailand competed in their knowledge of Buddhist ethics, which was designed to complement the national education system, which the temple believed had become too secularized. Due to the large number of students joining the temple's activities, who in the 1970s tended to be leftist, for a brief period Wat Phra Dhammakaya was accused of supporting the Communist insurgency in Thailand and the student uprisings in the 1970s.

Spokespeople of the temple describe the role of Maechi Chandra in the early period of the temple as a 'chief commander' (Thai: jomthap), whereas Luang Por Dhammajayo is depicted as a 'chief of staff' (Thai: senathikan) developing proper plans, whereas Luang Por Dattajīvo is described as the practical manager. During the years to follow, Maechi Chandra's role would gradually become less, as she grow older and withdrew more to the background of the temple's organization.

== Exponential growth (1979–1996) ==
=== Further development of the Dhammadayada program ===
After 1979, the Dhammadayada program began to include a temporary ordination. In Thailand, it had been a tradition for men to ordain for the monastic rains retreat (vassa) as a rite of passage before becoming adult. These ordinations were becoming shorter, and the temple was trying to reverse this trend. During such a training program at the temple, participants typically started off with rigorous physical training to prepare themselves for the program. When the training started, they kept the eight precepts, slept under mosquito nets in the open air, and meditated for four to eight hours per day. After this preparatory training, they ordained for the remaining period of at least one month. Ordination ceremonies were held at Wat Benchamabophit. The program initially focused on university students, starting with the network of friends of Luang Por Dhammajayo and Luang Por Dattajivo. During the period of the temple's construction, the Dhammadayada ordination plan gave training to hundreds of students, who swelled the number of residents in the temple community. For monks who stayed on for longer, ordaining for life was emphasized more than in other temples, though considerable screening took place before someone could do so. For women, a parallel training program was held from 1986 onward, in which the eight precepts were kept, but the women did not receive full ordination in the manner of bhikkhunis.

=== Appeal ===
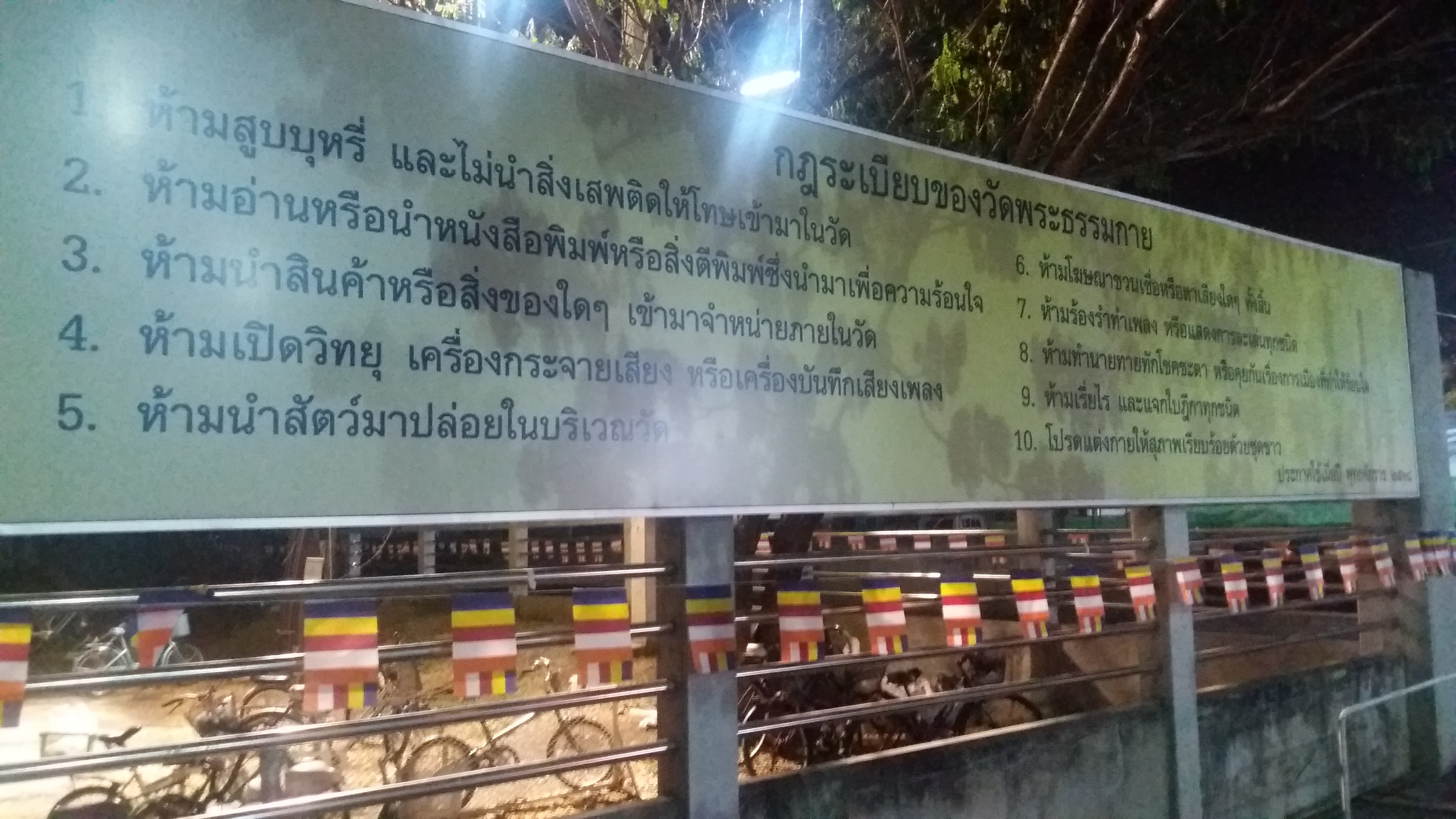
Maechi Chandra set strict rules and regulations for the temple community, such as a prohibition on political lobbying and selling things in the temple.

The temple gained great popularity during the 1980s (during the Asian economic boom), especially among the growing well-educated and entrepreneurial middle class, mostly small-business owners and technocrats of Sino-Thai origin. Royalty and high-standing civil servants also started to visit the temple, including the generals Arthit Kamlang-ek and Chaovalit Yongchaiyuth. During this period the temple experienced tremendous growth in terms of monks, lay workers and temple visitors. The temple therefore established a screening procedure for newcomer employees. Maechi Chandra set rules and regulations for the community, including a prohibition on political lobbying and selling things in the temple. Wat Phra Dhammakaya emphasized values of prosperity, modernity and personal development, which made it attractive for the middle class, especially during times of quick cultural and social changes. By the mid-1980s, the temple was attracting up to fifty thousand people for major ceremonies. The Dhammadaya ordination program started out with sixty participants in 1979; by 1986, over a thousand participants joined. In 1990, the temple had 260 monks, 214 samaneras (novices that are minors) and 441 full-time employees. In 1995, Wat Phra Dhammakaya caught the nation's attention when a Magha Puja celebration was broadcast live on television, with the then Crown Prince Vajiralongkorn as chairman of the ceremony.

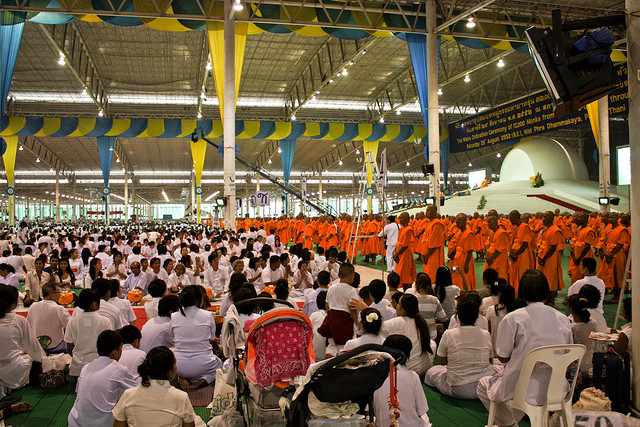
Ordination ceremony for new monks at Wat Phra Dhammakaya

=== Other activities ===
Wat Phra Dhammakaya became known for its emphasis on meditation, especially samatha meditation (meditation aiming at tranquility of mind). Every Sunday morning, meditation was taught to the public. Every weekend a meditation retreat was held at the temple at no cost. For these weekends, the temple started using the word dhutanga ('ascetic practice') for accommodation in the open air, a word normally used for monastic practice. Seven-day retreats were held regularly at several locations, during which participants were required to keep the eight precepts. Also, special retreats were led by Luang Por Dhammajayo himself in Doi Suthep. With regard to the three Trainings (Pali: tisikkha) in Buddhist teaching, the temple was described as the temple that represents the meditation aspect (Pali: samadhi), whereas the Santi Asoke movement represents the discipline aspect (Pali: sila) and Luang Por Buddhadasa and his followers the wisdom aspect (Pali: pañña).

One of the core activities of the temple, since its inception, has been the ceremony of 'honoring the Buddhas by food' (บูชาข้าวพระ), held every first Sunday of the month. This ceremony was so important to the temple's adherents that people from all over the country traveled by bus to join it, from urban and rural areas. It was usually led by the abbot himself, and, up until her death, by Maechi Chandra Khonnokyoong too. According to the temple's practitioners, in this ceremony food is offered to the Buddhas in meditation. The ceremony has been an important aspect of the temple's attractiveness to the public.

The temple also started to develop a social dimension in its activities. For example, it started promoting blood donations. The temple organized training programs for both the private and public sector, emphasizing peace and stability in society by training government officers to be more reliable. The temple also became active in promoting Buddhist scholarship and educational reform in the Sangha (monastic community), producing a CD with searchable texts of the Pali Canon in 1984, in cooperation with the Pali Text Society, Mahidol University and the University of California, Berkeley. In 1990, the temple also organized its first academic seminar Buddhism into the Year 2000, with over a hundred international scholars joining. On a more local level, the temple started to organize a yearly congratulation ceremony for Pali graduates at the highest level, and offered funds to temples that excelled at teaching Pali. The temple was known to have wide support from the Thai Sangha and was tolerated by the government, though at times the government asked the temple to limit its mass assemblies. In 1985, the Department of Religious Affairs, Ministry of Education, prohibited the building of a meditation center in a rural area, citing as a reason that it was not accessible enough for people to visit. Fuengfusakul concludes that during this period the government was afraid of the temple's ability to gather a large number of people.

In 1986, the Dhammakaya Foundation became a United Nations-accredited non-governmental organization, and started sending delegations to join workshops on youth and peace education. As of 2015, the foundation was in consultative status with the Economic and Social Council. In the 1980s, the foundation also became a member of the World Fellowship of Buddhist Youth and the World Fellowship of Buddhists networks, and later the chairman of the World Fellowship of Buddhist Youth. The foundation started to build up many relations with Buddhist organizations outside of Thailand, including Fo Guang Shan in Taiwan and the Ten Thousand Buddhas Monastery in Hong Kong, with Wat Phra Dhammakaya and Fo Guang Shan officially declaring each other sister temples in 1994.

From 1992 onwards, the temple started to found its first branch centers, in the United States, Japan and Taiwan.

=== Construction ===
The Ubosot was completed in 1982, and the ceremony for allocating of the Ubosot's boundary was held three years later. In 1984, Wat Phra Dhammakaya started expanding the temple's ground with two thousand rai (3.2 km^{2}). Surrounding land was bought from a land owner, on the condition that the temple would deal with the sixty-one farmers who rented the land. The temple offered the renting farmers the option to end the contract early and obtain a compensation, or to stay until the contract ended and then leave. Seven farmers disagreed with both proposals, however, and the temple raised its offer, but to no avail. The resisting farmers then organized a protest, which was joined by a hundred land tenants from other places who felt unfairly treated by real estate firms.

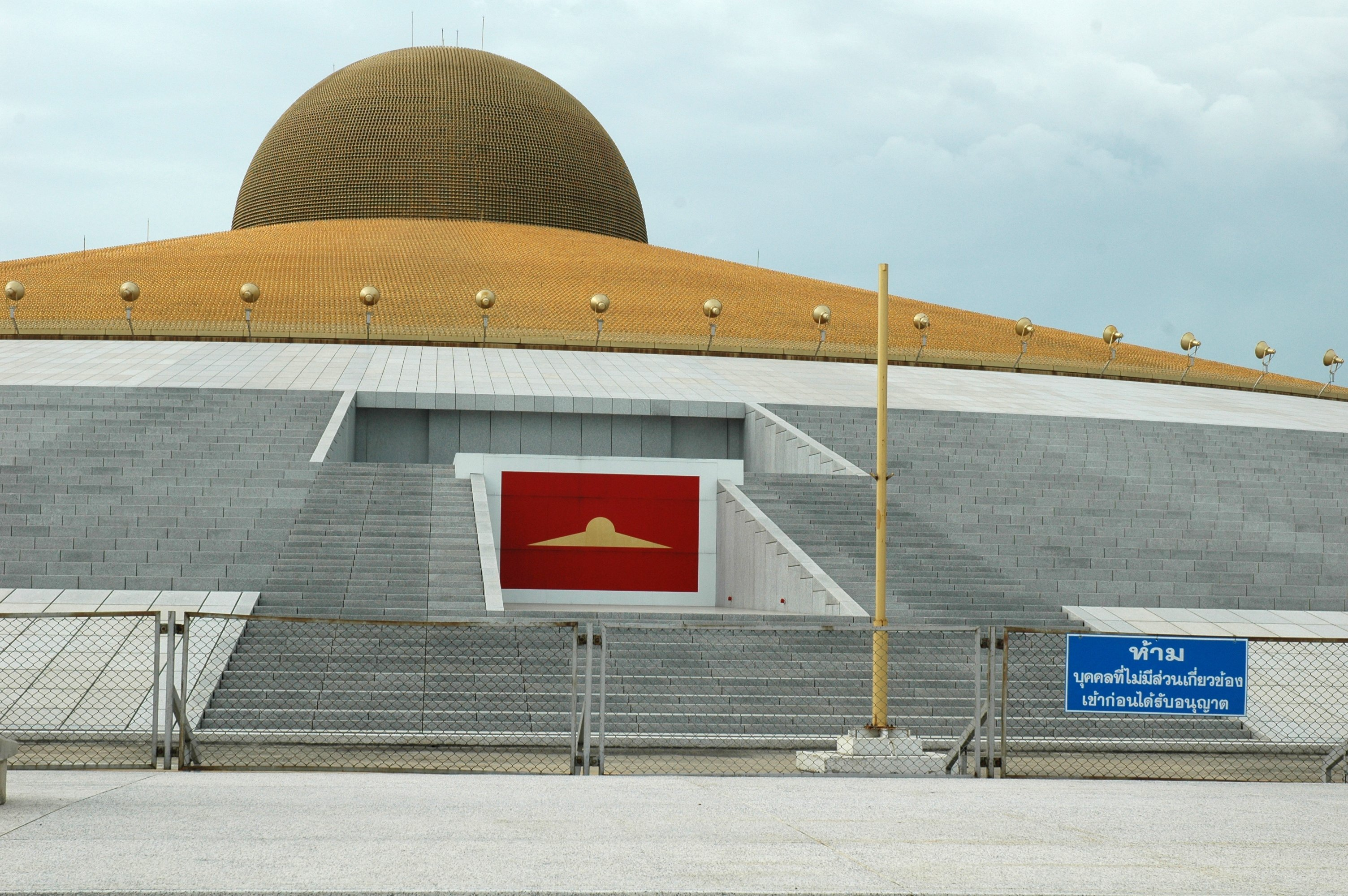
The Dhammakaya Cetiya, Wat Phra Dhammakaya

The protest, which was featured in all major Thai newspapers, ended with the tenants handing over a letter at a government office, asking for justice. The government investigated the temple's case, but concluded that the temple had acted lawfully. Outraged by the outcome, a number of protesters destroyed some parts of Wat Phra Dhammakaya's temple grounds, and the mob leader was arrested and imprisoned. The local municipality had to mediate and was able to persuade some of the farmers to accept the temple's proposal. Wat Phra Dhammakaya stated that they believed the protests were stirred up by investors who wanted the land for themselves.

In 1994, the temple began designing for the building of a huge stupa (a mound-like structure) which was later to become known as the Maha Dhammakaya Cetiya. The monument would be built to last for a thousand years, and would consist of a million Buddha images. An experienced architect and experienced engineers were employed, and the latest technology was used in the construction, to meet the demands of the project and to follow the traditions of cetiyas and stupas. Though traditionally stupas were often financed by kings, the Dhammakaya Cetiya was to be financed by people of all parts of society, all contributing their part. Attempts were made to involve the devotees of the temple through different stages of construction, through organizing meditations around the Cetiya, and holding ceremonies, in which people were given hammers to symbolically hit a foundation pile into the ground. The first pile was put in place on September 8, 1995.

== First clash with government (1997–2000) ==
=== The miracle controversy ===
In the late 1990s, Wat Phra Dhammakaya became known for its modern management and iconography, and became active in using modern media and public relations, to a scale which was until then unknown in Thailand. The temple even received a prize for best marketing strategies from the Marketing Association of Thailand, despite its earlier prohibition on commercial practices in the temple. In 1998, the temple first started to hold large-scale training programs, for laymen (13,824 participants) laywomen (140,000 participants) and samaneras (13,842 participants). The temple received much financial support, including donations from real-estate firms.

In November 1998, after a ceremony held at the Cetiya of the temple, the temple reported in brochures and national newspapers that a miracle (อัศจรรย์ตะวันแก้ว) had occurred at the Cetiya, which was witnessed by thousands of people. The miracle involved seeing an image of a Buddha or of Luang Pu Sodh imposed on the sun. Shortly afterwards, the Thai media responded very critically, leading to a nationwide, very intense debate about the state of Thai Buddhism in general, and Wat Phra Dhammakaya in particular, that lasted for an unusually long ten months. Critics believed that Wat Phra Dhammakaya, and Thai Buddhism in general, had become too much of a commercial enterprise (พุทธพาณิชย์) and had grown corrupt; practitioners and temple devotees argued tradition was being followed.

The main criticism was that the temple was using fundraising methods that did not fit in with Buddhism. Examples that were pointed out were the fact that fundraising resembled direct sales, the distribution of amulets to donors as complementary gifts and the use of modern technology. Scholars in Buddhism, such as Luang Por Payutto, social critic Sulak Sivaraksa, as well as two monks who formerly lived at the temple, all argued against the temple's fundraising methods. Moreover, some teachings of the temple were criticized: the idea that large donations yield greater fruits or merit, and the idea that Nibbana was the true self. (See § Principles, practices and beliefs) Although many of these methods and teachings were not unique to Wat Phra Dhammakaya, the criticism came at a moment when the temple had become very noticeable due to its size, its high-profile supporters, and due to the project of building the Cetiya, which required a lot of funds. All of this was against the backdrop of the financial crisis that Thailand was going through.

Wat Phra Dhammakaya replied to the critics of the Cetiya building project that the building had begun before the crisis, when the economy was still booming; therefore, the timing was not wrong. The temple also raised examples of other important Thai building projects that had been realized during crises. Finally, the temple posed the question: if, despite the crisis, people were still buying alcohol and cigarettes and still going to the movies, then what was wrong with donating for a religious building? The temple also responded to its critics about the accusations of wealth, stating that the temple's wealth was used for the laypeople and Buddhist education, not for other purposes. Building large buildings benefited Buddhism as a whole, not just the temple, because it helped strengthen the religion. Apart from donating to hospitals or schools, financially supporting Buddhism should also be done, because it would help foster ethics in society.

=== Investigations and lawsuits ===
Under pressure of public outcry and critics, January 1999 the Sangha Supreme Council started an investigation in the accusations, led by Luang Por Ñanavaro, Chief of the Greater Bangkok Region. (Note: Then known by the title "Phraprommolee".) The Sangha Council declared that Wat Phra Dhammakaya had not broken any serious offenses against monastic discipline (Vinaya) that were cause for defrocking (removal from monkhood), but four directives were given for the temple to improve itself: setting up an Abhidhamma school, more focus on vipassana meditation, and strict adherence to the rules of the Vinaya and regulations of the Sangha Council. One of the accusations Luang Por Ñanavaro investigated was that Luang Por Dhammajayo had moved land donated to the temple to his own name. Wat Phra Dhammakaya denied this, stating that it was the intention of the donors to give the land to the abbot, and not the temple. Nevertheless, Luang Por Ñanavaro asked the Religious Affairs Department to assist Luang Por Dhammajayo in returning the land to the temple. The abbot stated he was willing to transfer the land, but this required some time, because it required negotiation with the original donors. When by May the temple had not moved all the land yet, a number of things happened.

First, a letter was leaked to the press which was signed by the Supreme Patriarch (head of the Thai monastic community). This implied that Luang Por Dhammajayo had to disrobe because he had not transferred donated land back to the temple. A warning had preceded this letter, which government officials said had not yet been forwarded to the Sangha Council and Wat Phra Dhammakaya. The statement had a great impact. In response, the Religious Affairs Department pressed criminal charges of embezzlement against the abbot and a close aide. The temple stated that, being subject to a criminal lawsuit (as opposed to a religious trial), the abbot would no longer transfer the land, because this might be interpreted as acceptance of guilt. Wat Phra Dhammakaya and the Sangha Council requested the department to wait until the monastic trials were finished first, but it continued the lawsuit. Moreover, the department set up a public help-desk and post office box to receive complaints about the temple, security officials of other departments stated they "were closely monitoring Dhammachayo", and Prince Vajiralongkorn personally showed an interest in the investigations. With the resulting witness accounts, more charges were laid against Luang Por Dhammajayo. In the process of these investigations, the main politicians responsible, that is the Minister and Deputy Minister of Education, were both replaced, with the new Minister Somsak Prissanananthakul assuming a key role in the judicial processes against the abbot.

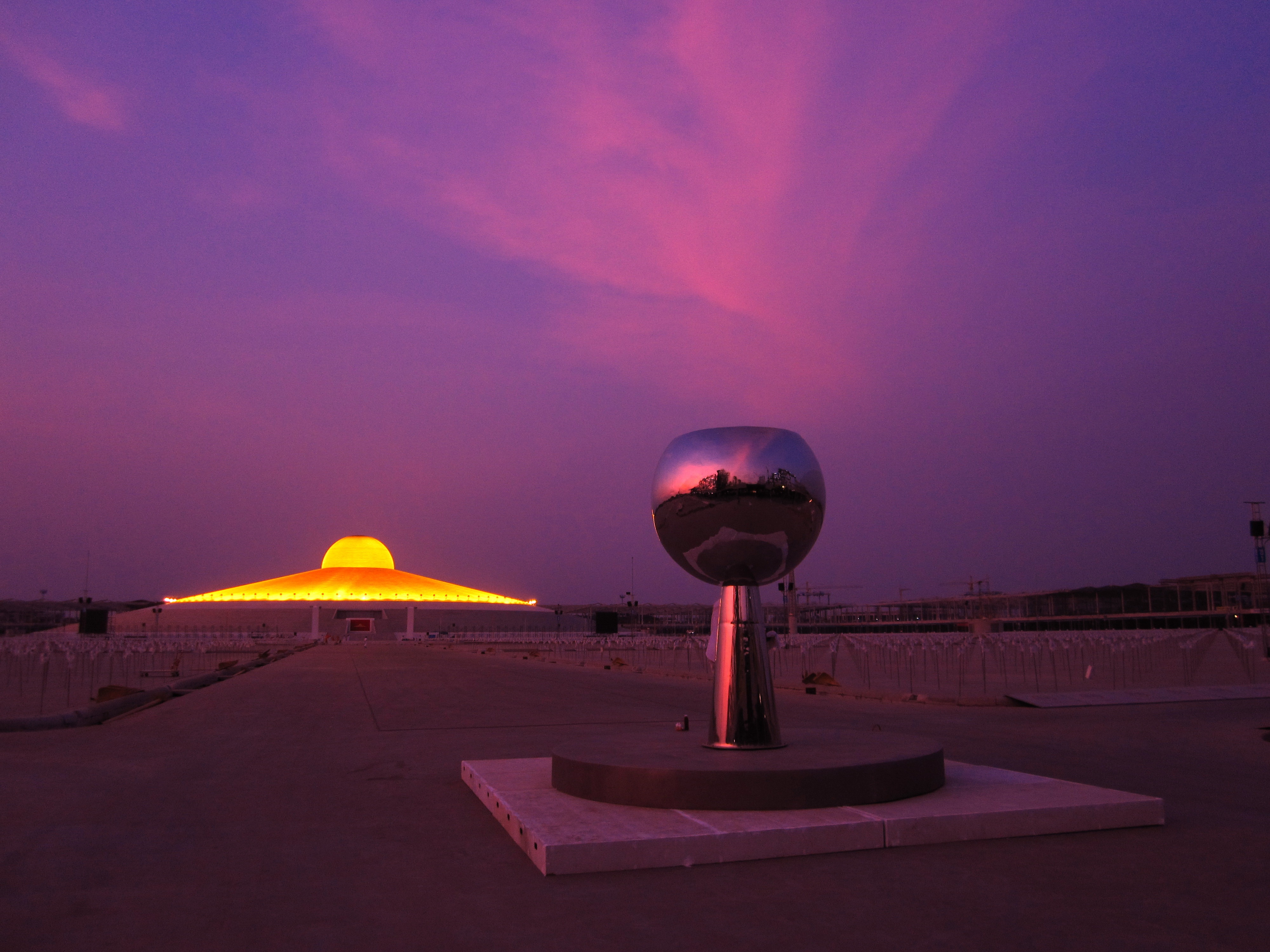
The Dhammakaya Cetiya at night.

In June, the prosecutors started summoning Luang Por Dhammajayo, but he did not go to acknowledge the charges, citing bad health. The temple cited the legal rights of monks under the constitution, pointing out that possessing personal property is common and legal in the Thai Sangha. Spokespeople also questioned the authenticity of the letter of the Patriarch. (Note: The Supreme Patriarch had fallen ill, and could not easily be visited). Luang Por Dhammajayo then declared publicly that he would not disrobe under any circumstances, but "would die in the [monk's] saffron robes". When the Prime Minister himself pressured the abbot to acknowledge the charges, the temple asked for a guarantee that the abbot would not be imprisoned and consequently defrocked. (Note: Disrobing effectively strips a Buddhist monk from his status and position within the monastic community, and is therefore considered by practitioners tantamount to execution.) No such guarantee was given, an arrest warrant followed, and a standoff began between a police force of hundreds, and thousands of the temple's practitioners, in which the latter barricaded the temple's entrances. After two days, Luang Por Dhammajayo agreed to let the police take him when the requested guarantee was given, and a Sangha Council member threatened to defrock the abbot if he did not go with the police. The abbot was interrogated for three hours, but not defrocked. Then he was released on a bail of two million baht, still on the same day. The news made headlines worldwide. From November onward, Luang Por Dhammajayo started visiting the court for the first time.

The Ministry of Education also accused Luang Por Dhammajayo of having stated that the Tipitaka (Buddhist scriptures) was incomplete. This accusation was religious in nature, however, and would normally only be made by other monks in a monastic trial. Luang Por Ñanavaro and Wat Phra Dhammakaya therefore questioned the jurisdiction of laypeople in this matter. Indeed, despite certain powers that the ministry had about religious matters, in the 1990s, there was no law against "heresy" in Thailand. Nevertheless, religious and state officials continued to assert that the temple's teachings constituted criminal offenses. Eventually it was decided that the charges could be pressed, as long as the accuser in the final trial was a monk. A period of investigation passed by, after which Luang Por Ñanavaro insisted that the Sangha Council's four-point advice had been sufficient. Discussions arose in the media, questioning the authority of the Thai Sangha and government to deal with problems within the Thai Sangha, and Luang Por Ñanavaro was removed from the Sangha Council and replaced.

Meanwhile, Luang Por Dhammajayo was suspended as abbot, as the trials continued and Luang Por Dhammajayo's deputies continued to manage the temple. The chief monk overseeing the local temples in the area had to be removed from office in the process, because he refused to suspend Luang Por Dhammajayo. Luang Por Dhammajayo had fallen ill and was hospitalized with throat and lung infections. In the 2000s, the controversies gradually lost the interest of the public, as the news focused on other topics, although in 2002 a fifth charge against the abbot was added to the list. (Note: The five charges were: helping a civil servant to act unlawfully, two charges of embezzlement of land and two charges of embezzlement of money.) The trials proceeded slowly, as the hearings were postponed because of evidence that was not ready, and because of the abbot's illness.

=== The temple's response ===
During the Supreme Sangha's investigations, the temple responded little to the accusations. But when the Ministry of Education decided to no longer wait on the Sangha Council's investigations, and pressed charges on Wat Phra Dhammakaya, the temple responded by suing for malicious prosecution. The temple accused several leading people in the Ministry of abusing their position, and petitioned the Constitutional Court, calling the religious charges a violation of freedom of religion. Spokespeople and proponents of the temple described the response of the ministry and the media as "stirring up controversy", and politically motivated.

During this period, many news reporters used pejorative language in describing the Sangha Council, the Supreme Patriarch, or Wat Phra Dhammakaya. In May 1999, monastic chiefs of regions nationwide sent a letter to the Prime Minister to help protect Buddhism and pressure media to use more polite language and show more respect for judicial processes. News reporters would often use abusive or pejorative language describing the temple or Luang Por Dhammajayo, such as 'idiot with glasses' (ไอ้แว่น) or simply calling Luang Por Dhammajayo by his first name used as a layman, "Chaiyabun", as though he had already been defrocked. December 1999, Wat Phra Dhammakaya sued the newspapers Matichon, Siam Rath, Khao Sod, Daily News and the television station ITV. The temple laid civil and criminal charges for slander, accusing the media outlets for depicting the temple in a distorted way. In 2001 and 2003, ITV, Siam Rath, and Matichon were found guilty of slander and forced by verdict to issue a public apology in their newspapers, (Note: ITV doing so through Bangkok Biz News, also owned by The Nation Group.) admitting to publishing distorted information about Luang Por Dhammajayo trading in stock, transferring money to mistresses, and other accusations. Siam Rath was also found guilty of violating the authority of the court, by publishing incorrect information on a verdict. The charges laid against Daily News were dismissed, however, because of being laid too late.

Although the period of intense media attention of 1999–2000 had disastrous effects on the temple, the temple still continued to organize projects, ceremonies and other events. The temple persuaded supporters nationwide to open their homes or workplaces as kalyanamitta homes ('houses of good Dhamma friends'), for establishing a culture of shared meditation practice and wisdom. In 2000, during a celebration of the new millennium at the newly built Dhammakaya Cetiya, 300,000 people joined. Many monks from different temples of Thailand joined as well, and temples and NGOs from outside of Thailand. This period also brought Boonchai Bencharongkul to the temple, then CEO of the telecommunications company DTAC. In 1999, the temple had thirteen centers outside of Thailand.

When in 2000 the Thai Maharat Party was founded, it was suspected the temple had a hand in it. Founder Kanin Boonsuwan denied the temple's influence in the founding, although he admitted some of its members were Dhammakaya practitioners.

In 2000, Maechi Chandra Konnokyoong died. The temple announced it would give people the time to pay their respects for several months, after which Maechi Chandra's remains would be cremated.

== Nationwide activities (2001–2006) ==
The period of 2001 to 2006 was the period that Thaksin Shinawatra came into power. It was a period of increased democratization and diversification of civil society in Thailand, as the Thai parliament withdrew itself from religious affairs. The temple thrived on this, though the temple did work on similar objectives as the government in terms of education, health care and even national security. The temple was no longer at the margins of the religious landscape in Thailand, but started to integrate itself within the Maha Nikaya fraternity. It was the period the temple cremated their teacher Maechi Chandra, and it was a period that the temple started to expand its activities to a national scale.

=== Cremation of Maechi Chandra Khonnokyoong ===
On 3 February 2002, Maechi Chandra's remains were cremated, and abbots of 30,000 temples were invited to join the cremation, to give the lay people the chance to make merit in gratitude to Maechi Chandra. During the cremation, there was merit-making and meditation. 100,000 monks and another 100,000 laypeople joined the cremation. Many high-standing guests joined, including the Supreme Patriarch of Cambodia. Maechi Chandra's remains were burnt in a grand ceremony, using glass to ignite the fire by sun light. Her ashes were kept in a small stupa. Critics said the cremation was too grand for a nun, but the Religious Affairs Department said it was the temple's right to organize the event at this scale. Scott cites Maechi Chandra's cremation as evidence that some female religious leaders have had a great impact on Thai society.

=== Campaigns against drinking and smoking ===
In the 2000s, the temple began to focus more on promoting an ethical lifestyle, using the five and eight precepts as a foundation. Nationwide people were encouraged to quit drinking and smoking through a campaign called The Lao Phao Buri (เทเหล้าเผาบุหรี่, literally: 'throw away alcohol and burn cigarettes'), cooperating with other religious traditions. This project led the World Health Organization (WHO) to present a World No Tobacco Day Award to Luang Por Dhammajayo on 31 May 2004. Over two hundred The Lao Phao Buri ceremonies were held, involving literally the pouring away of alcoholic beverages and the burning of cigarettes. The ceremonies were later to become a regular practice in schools and government institutions. The temple's campaign became more widely known when in 2005 the beverage company Thai Beverage announced its intention to list in the Stock Exchange of Thailand, which would be the biggest listing in Thai history. Despite attempts by the National Office of Buddhism (a government agency) to prohibit monks from protesting, two thousand monks of the temple organized a chanting of Buddhist texts in front of the Stock Exchange to pressure them to decline Thai Beverage's initial public offering. (Note: The temple used the project name "Thai Buddhist Monks National Coordination Center".) In an unprecedented cooperative effort, the temple was soon followed suit by former Black May revolt leader Chamlong Srimuang and the Santi Asoke movement. Subsequently, another 122 religious and social organizations joined, belonging to several religions and reaching numbers of 10,000 protesters. The organizations asked Prime Minister Thaksin to stop the company, in what some of the protest leaders described as "a grave threat to the health and culture" of Thai society. While the Stock Exchange pointed out the economical benefits of this first local listing, opponents referred to rising alcohol abuse in Thai society, ranking fifth in alcohol consumption according to the UN Food and Agriculture Organization. Ultimately, the protests led to an indefinite postponement of the listing by the Stock Exchange. Thai Beverage chose to list in Singapore instead, as the Stock Exchange chief resigned as a result.

=== International meditation and the tsunami memorials ===
The temple broadened its activities to a more national scope. The temple started its own satellite channel called Dhammakaya Media Channel (DMC), and a university that supports distance learning. The temple started to use this satellite channel to broadcast live events to branch centers, such as guided meditations. Wat Phra Dhammakaya started to develop a more international approach to its teachings, teaching meditation in not-Buddhist countries as a religiously neutral technique suitable for those of all faiths, or none. An international Dhammadayada program was also started, held in Chinese and English, and the temple started to organize retreats in English language in Thailand and abroad. Later on, guided meditations were also held online, in different languages. The temple was the first new religious organization in Thailand to effectively use Internet technology in disseminating their teachings.

In 2004, Wat Phra Dhammakaya made headlines when it offered aid to victims of the 2004 tsunami disaster in Thailand, through charity and by organizing inter-faith memorial services for the victims in Phang Nga and Phuket. The temple acted as an intermediary in the coordination between the government and NGOs.

The Path of Progress contest started to expand (as of 2006, 19,839 schools, according to the temple) and a number of schools in other countries started to compete in their knowledge of Buddhist ethics as well.

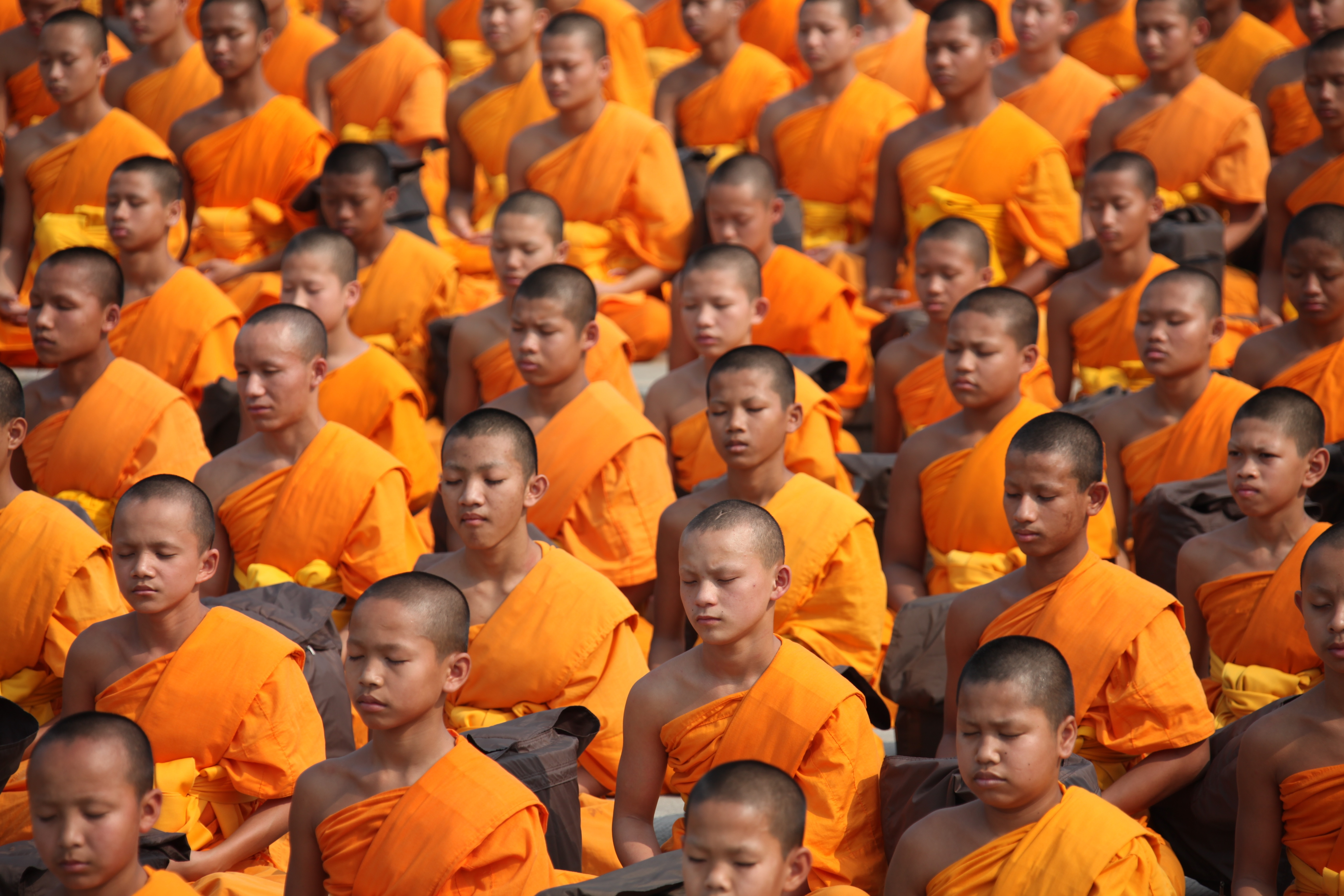
As of 2006, the community living at Wat Phra Dhammakaya numbered more than a thousand monks and samaneras.

=== Charges withdrawn ===
In 2006, the running lawsuits ended when the Attorney-General of Thailand withdrew the charges against Luang Por Dhammajayo. He stated that Luang Por Dhammajayo had moved all the land to the name of the temple, that he had corrected his teachings according to the Tipitaka, and that continuing the case might create division in society, (Note: In 2006, there were rising political conflicts.) and would not be conducive to public benefit. Furthermore, Luang Por Dhammajayo had assisted the Sangha, the government and the private sector significantly in organizing religious activities. Luang Por Dhammajayo's position as an abbot was subsequently restored. Critics questioned whether the charges were withdrawn because of the political influence of Prime Minister Thaksin.

When PM Thaksin was in power, the temple was often accused of having close ties to him, influencing his policies. The temple has denied this, saying that all political parties are welcome in the temple. In 2006, before the charges were withdrawn, Wat Phra Dhammakaya hosted a meeting of 78,540 local administrators, led by PM Thaksin, themed Every religion working together for local development. The meeting was held as a form of inter-faith dialogue between Buddhists, Christians and Muslims, in which speakers of each religion explained their views on local economical and social development. Critics argued this was a political rally, but the government and the temple stated that the temple simply offered a venue which was hard to find elsewhere, and the temple did not take part in the actual event.

Although the temple did have similar methods as Thaksin to build a mass support base, and raise funds, the political connection with the Red Shirts was not so self-evident. Some major supporters of the temple were publicly known as members of the Yellow Shirts political pressure group, which was strongly opposed to PM Thaksin. At least one Red Shirt leader has later come out to state that there is no link between Wat Phra Dhammakaya and the Red Shirt pressure group. Anthropologist Jim Taylor believes the temple's involvement in political agendas was most intensive in the early period, but after that had become less, and in 2017 described the temple as "stoically politically neutral, aloof". A Prachatai columnist argued that there may be some relation between Dhammakaya, Thaksin and his party, but to equate Thaksin with Dhammakaya and Somdet Chuang, or to equate devotees of Dhammakaya with Red Shirts, would be going too far. As for the temple's spokespeople, in a widely cited survey of political opinion among Thai monastics, the temple stated they did not choose any political side. They did disagree with the coup d'état as a political solution as opposed to a peaceful solution.

As of 2006, the community living at Wat Phra Dhammakaya numbered over a thousand monks and samaneras, and hundreds of laypeople. The temple also had two thousand volunteers for help in ceremonies. Although, like most Thai temples, the temple had no formal sense of membership, congregations on Sundays and major religious holidays, such as Kathina or Magha Puja, were estimated at over a hundred thousand people. Worldwide, the temple's following was estimated at one million practitioners.

== Wider public engagement (2007–2013) ==
=== Educational and scholarly programs ===
In April 2007, while a government-appointed council was working on drafting a new constitution, a march of two thousand monks and lay people was held to press the council to include in the new constitution that Buddhism become the state religion of Thailand. Wat Phra Dhammakaya supported the march. Prime Minister Surayud Chulanont stated, however, that such a clause was not feasible, as it would lead to rejection of the draft.

From 2008 onward, the temple extended its youth activities to include a training course in Buddhist practice known as V-Star, and a yearly national day of Buddhist activities. In the V-Star course, children were encouraged to observe ten daily practices, among which paying respect to their parents, and chanting Buddhist texts before sleeping. Students were also encouraged to lead Kathina ceremonies in local temples. (Note: There had been a problem with temples not being able to organize Kathina ceremonies due to lack of supporters or funds.) The point of these practices was to create good habits, fostered through a cooperation between parents, teachers and monks (บ้าน วัด โรงเรียน, shortened as บวร). On a yearly V-Star day the children normally meditated and chanted, but also listened to Buddhist teachings, watched an exhibition and solved problems about those teachings. They confirmed their Buddhist faith through a refuge ceremony. The day closed by watching a 3D movie with a Buddhist theme. As of 2014, five thousand schools joined the program.

Together these programs were called the 'World Morality Revival' (ฟื้นฟูศีลธรรมโลก) project, using the slogan "knowledge combined with virtue". The project became noticeable quite soon, when former PM Thaksin Shinawatra and Deputy PM Somchai Wongsawat were guest speakers on the 2008 V-Star Day. To promote these programs further, Wat Phra Dhammakaya started cooperating extensively with the Ministry of Education, the temple's education department signing an MoU (Memorandum Of Understanding) with the Office of the Basic Education Commission (OBEC) in 2010. Shortly after signing the MoU, however, the Minister of Education asked a commission to review the programs mentioned in it. The ministry was criticized by a network of scholars, led by Sulak Sivaraksa, for being too personally involved with the temple. The contents of the proposed programs were also questioned. The minister issued a press release, stating the involvement was merely professional, but he would be careful as the project would become more concrete. As the plans evolved, it became clear the temple wanted to offer training programs to millions of youth through the entire country. Essential to the project was the idea that teachers would work more together to promote good morals in education. Criticism did not stop, however, and the program was brought to a halt, only to be revived by Yingluck Shinawatra's government. Three nationwide training programs were held in the period of 2010 to 2013. Programs involved meditation, Buddhist teaching and keeping eight precepts. The OBEC often defended the project, saying that nationwide many temples were involved in the project, not just Wat Phra Dhammakaya, as well as many organizations promoting Buddhist education.

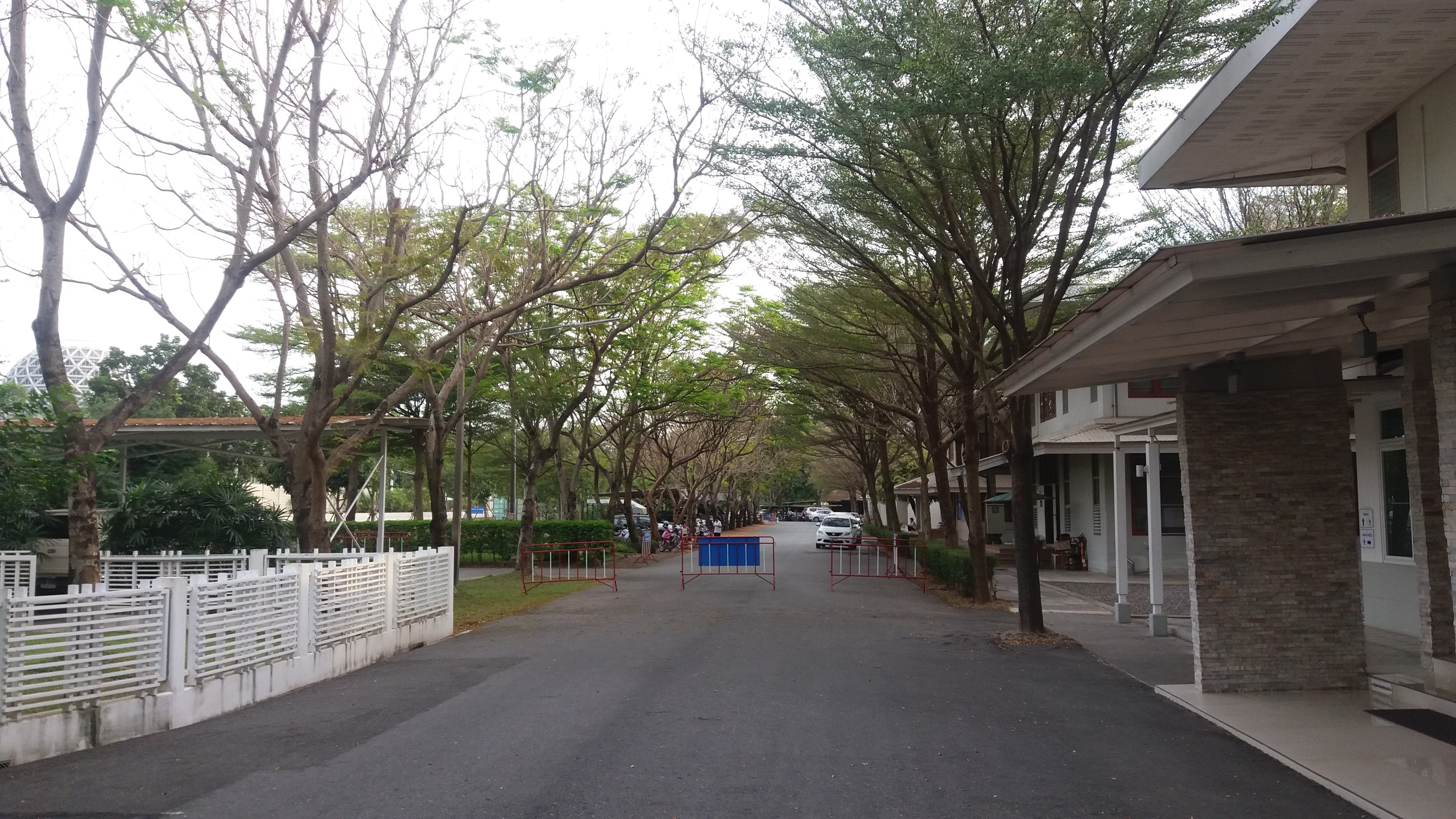
The Pariyattithum School at Wat Phra Dhammakaya, where Pali language and Buddhist Studies are taught.

Also, in this period, Wat Phra Dhammakaya started to invest more resources in its own education and scholarship. In 2009, Wat Phra Dhammakaya had the highest number of Pali (language of the Theravada Buddhist canon) graduates in the central area of Thailand. The temple was continuously ranked as one of the five highest in the country in Pali studies. In 2010, Wat Phra Dhammakaya started the Dhammachai Tipitaka Project, providing facilities for scholars worldwide to work together collecting ancient manuscripts, mostly from Myanmar, Sri Lanka and Thailand, to make a critical edition of the Pali Canon, the Theravada Buddhist scriptures. This edition was to provide the technology and comparative data for scholars to come to a reconstruction of the Tipitaka texts as they were known in the fifth century CE, when they were first written down. There were over a hundred staff members working on the project worldwide, divided in manuscript reading teams. The work was reviewed by an international advisory board of scholars, including Rupert Gethin, Richard Gombrich and Oskar von Hinüber. A digital version of the Tipitaka was expected to be completed by 2028, but the first part was published in 2015. The project backfired, however, when Matichon and other Thai newspapers interpreted the project as an actual correcting or 'purification of the Tipitaka' (ชำระพระไตรปิฎก), as this was done in the historical Buddhist Councils. Wat Phra Dhammakaya denied this in a press statement, however. They said it was not their intention to rewrite the Pali Canon, and considered it unlikely that in the present day anyone could do so. Wat Phra Dhammakaya set up another research institute, located in Australia, called DIRI (Dhammachai International Research Institute). This institute promoted research on manuscripts of early Buddhism, and offered fellowships to that end.

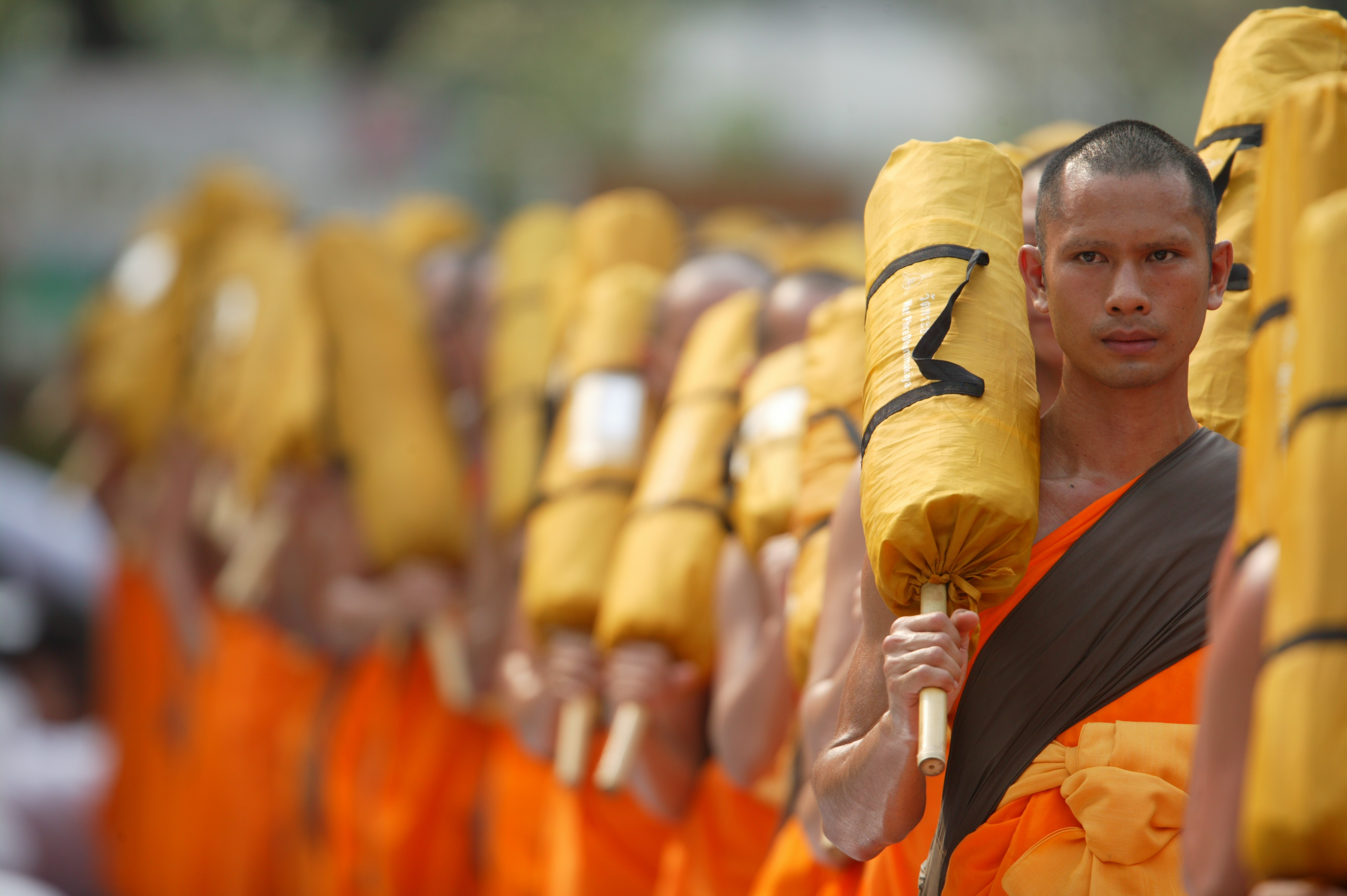
In 2011, Wat Phra Dhammakaya started to organize pilgrimages passing important places in the life of Luang Pu Sodh Candasaro.

=== Teaching in the city ===
The temple also started to organize huge alms giving events around the country, including at important sites in Bangkok, some of which were joined by thousands of monks. The alms giving events were held to help bring monks and lay people together, to revive the custom of alms giving, and as a dedication of merit to the victims of the insurgency in the Southern provinces. The profits from the alms giving events were used to support the temples and teachers in the South with aid and supplies. The events were the first mass gatherings which the junta had allowed since the 2006 coup d'état. In 2012, the alms events became more prominent when then Prime Minister Yingluck Shinawatra joined an event in person, as well as comedian Udom Taepanich.

In 2011, in Thailand's worst flooding for more than half-a-century, a great deal of Bangkok and its outskirts were inundated, including Patumthani, the area where Wat Phra Dhammakaya is located. Working together with the government, the temple deployed monastic and lay volunteers to bring a halt to the floods in the area, who had to work day and night to build walls using sandbags and pump out the water. At the same time, the temple offered shelter to evacuated workers from local factories, food, drinking water, transport and sandbags to local villagers, other affected temples and temples that also offered shelter.

From 2009 onwards, Wat Phra Dhammakaya expanded its temporary ordination program by making it nationwide. In this program, the participants were trained in thousands of temples spread over Thailand, but ordained simultaneously at Wat Phra Dhammakaya. Held in cooperation with the House of Representatives, the concept of the program was to reverse the trend of the number of monks in Thailand decreasing. The program was held twice a year, and the participants who decided to stay in the monkhood were encouraged to revive abandoned temples. In 2010, 10,685 monks joined the program. As part of the ordination programs, Wat Phra Dhammakaya started to organize pilgrimages passing important places in the life of Luang Pu Sodh. This was done through a procession by over a thousand monks through the areas of Central Thailand that were flooded before, while life-size images of Luang Pu Sodh were ceremonially brought to install in pilgrimage places. During the breaks between the walks, the monks spent their time meditating, chanting and making good wishes to those affected by the floods.

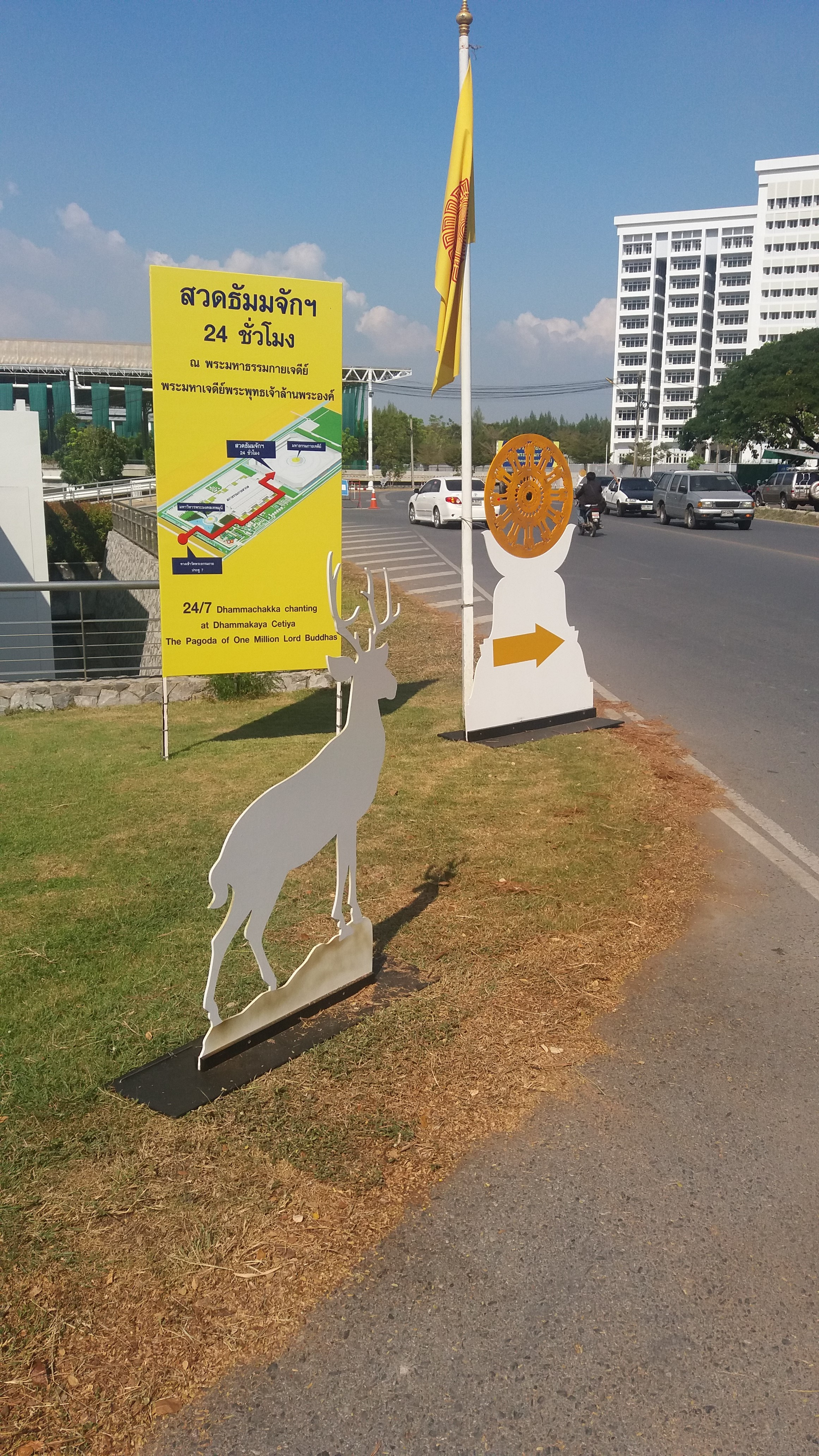
Signs at the roadside inviting people to recite the Dhammacakkappavattana Sutta at Wat Phra Dhammakaya.

The pilgrimages were held with analogy to the traditional story of the Buddha ridding Vesali of illness and drought. On the way to Vesali, the Buddha's entire route had been decorated with flowers by King Bimbisara. As a re-enactment of this story, throughout the walks, laypeople spread self-picked flowers to pave a path for the monk-pilgrims. Controversially, the temple used the word dhutanga for the walks, as it did before with its retreats. Responses were varied. On the one hand, the pilgrimage caused many people to participate with enthusiasm in the activities organized. For example, managers of some companies let the entire workforce take leave to join the flower-spreading. Critics, however, said the dhutanga walks were causing traffic jams, and were not in accordance with traditional interpretations of dhutanga practice. The temple then defended the walks by stating that the monks joining actually took dhutanga vows, and by pointing out the spiritual benefits for the laypeople joining. A senator asked the National Office of Buddhism to investigate the matter further. Initially, the National Office of Buddhism approved of the city pilgrimage, saying that it agreed with Buddhist ideas and helped the economy. Meanwhile, some news analysts speculated that the pilgrimages were meant to express loyalty to Somdet Chuang, the Supreme Patriarch to be. The appointment of the Supreme Patriarch was subject to rising disagreement, which fed the protesters' resentment. Later, in 2015, the walk over spread flowers was approved as a Guinness world record in the category "Longest journey walking on flower petals". Still in 2015 the National Office of Buddhism told Wat Phra Dhammakaya to stop organizing the pilgrimage walks in Bangkok, and only organize them outside of Bangkok, citing the problem of the traffic jams. At the end of the year, when the criticism did not tone down, Wat Phra Dhammakaya announced they would postpone organizing the pilgrimages indefinitely. Religious Studies scholar Surapot Thaweesak argues that the debate about the pilgrimages is really a discussion about whether a religious organization can use public space and to what extent.

In 2010, during the Red Shirt protests, in an attempt to keep control of any initiatives opposing the junta, a number of monastic and academic organizations and people, including Luang Por Dhammajayo, were put on a surveillance list by the Thai military. Duncan McCargo speculates that this information may have been deliberately leaked to the press as a form of threat to these organizations and people. Wat Phra Dhammakaya did not openly join any Red Shirt activities, but some leading members of pro-Thaksin parties were connected to the temple.

In 2012, the temple broadcast a talk of Luang Por Dhammajayo about what happened to Steve Jobs after his death. The talk came as a response to a software engineer of Apple who had sent a letter with questions to the abbot. Luang Por Dhammajayo described what Steve Jobs looked like in heaven. He said that Jobs had been reborn as a deva living close to his former offices, as a result of the karma of having given knowledge to people. The talk was much criticized, and the abbot was accused of pretending to have attained an advanced meditative state and of attempting to outshine other temples. The temple stated that the talk was meant to illustrate the law of karma, not to defame Jobs, nor to fake an advanced state.

As of 2010, Wat Phra Dhammakaya was the fastest growing temple of Thailand. As of 2015, the temple had twenty-eight centers in Thailand, and eighty centers outside of Thailand, in all continents, except for South-America. The ceremonies of the temple were often led by monks from the Supreme Sangha Council or other leading monks, and joined by high-ranking people from Thailand and other Buddhist countries. For major festivals, the number of practitioners reached 300,000 people.

== Standoff with junta (2014–present) ==
=== Junta's reform council versus Sangha Council ===
After the 2014 coup d'état, several initiatives were started to bring change to Thai society, which the junta stated was necessary before elections could be held. Among these measures, a National Reform Council was founded and the religious committee of this council was led by Paiboon Nititawan, a former senator who had played a crucial role in the coup. Backed by the bureaucracy, military and Royal Palace, Paiboon sought to deal with any shortcomings in the leading Thai Sangha through judicial means. He was joined by then monk Phra Suwit Dhiradhammo (known under the activist name Phra Buddha Issara), a former infantryman who had assumed a main role in the coup as well. Finally, Mano Laohavanich, a former monk of Wat Phra Dhammakaya, also a member of the reform council, joined the investigations.

To start with, Phra Suwit requested the Department of Special Investigation (DSI), a department modeled on the FBI, to start an investigation in the assets of the Sangha Council's members. This included Somdet Chuang Varapuñño, who was Luang Por Dhammajayo's preceptor (the person who ordained him), who had been nominated by the council to become the next Supreme Patriarch per 5 January 2016. Phra Suwit objected to this nomination, and successfully held a petition to stop it.

In the meantime, in February 2015, Paiboon Nititawan tried to reopen the 1999 case of Luang Por Dhammajayo's alleged embezzlement of land. Somdet Chuang and the rest of the Sangha Council were also involved in this, as they were accused of being negligent in not defrocking Luang Por Dhammajayo. First, the Sangha Council reconsidered the embezzlement and fraud charges, but concluded that Luang Por Dhammajayo had not intended to commit fraud or embezzlement, and had already returned the land concerned; (Note: In the same period, Narong Nuchuea, a leading journalist on religious affairs, came out to state that the statement of the Supreme Patriarch was fake, because "politics got involved". He said that the then Supreme Patriarch would never leak such a letter to the press. Several Thai journalists and scholars have stated that the letter was suspicious for several reasons, including its layout, and the timing it was issued, and was therefore never taken in consideration by the Sangha Council. The Sangha Council itself stated that the Supreme Patriarch's letter was not an unconditional order: it said that Luang Por Dhammajayo should disrobe if (and only if) he did not return the land on his name to the temple.) after that, Phra Suwit enlisted the help of the Ombudsman, who asked the General-Attorney and the National Office of Buddhism to reconsider the criminal law case of embezzlement. (Note: The Ombudsman pointed out that the returning of land could not in itself be cause for withdrawing the charges: it would only make the charges less severe. Moreover, although recognizing that he had no jurisdiction with regard to ecclesiastical law, he did point out some inconsistencies which he believed indicated that the Sangha Council had not taken the letter of the Supreme Patriarch very seriously.)

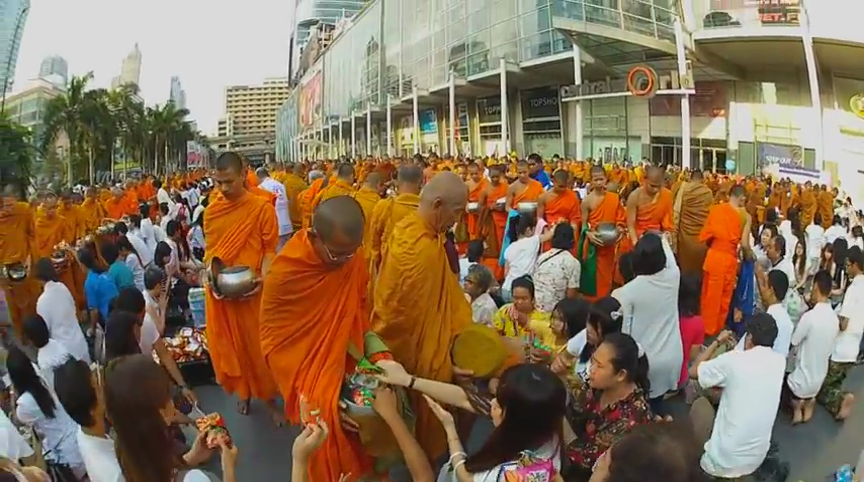
The temple also started to organize huge alms giving events around the country, including at important sites in Bangkok.

These investigations did not go without response. In February 2016, on Magha Puja, a protest was held by over a thousand Thai monks in the Phutthamonthon Park, as a response to this involvement by the junta. The protest was organized by the Buddhist Protection Center of Thailand, a Red Shirt-oriented network. The protesters demanded that the Thai junta not interfere with the Sangha's affairs, in particular the appointment of the next Supreme Patriarch. After the junta responded by sending soldiers to control the site, the protest ended, but the monks announced they would repeat their protests if their demands were not met. Wat Phra Dhammakays's involvement was implied by the media. The temple denied organizing the protests, but did not disagree with them. At this point, the charges laid by Paiboon and Phra Suwit against the temple were by many interpreted as a way to discredit Somdet Chuang. Somdet Chuang had been abbot of Wat Paknam Bhasicharoen and preceptor (Pali: upajjhaya; person who ordained him) of Luang Por Dhammajayo during the latter's first years at Wat Paknam. Moreover, several Thai intellectuals and news analysts stated that Paiboon, Phra Suwit and Mano were abusing the Vinaya (monastic discipline) for political ends, and did not really aim to "purify" Buddhism.

The investigations were widely reported in the press, but eventually junta leader Prayut Chan-o-cha intervened: the embezzlement case had already been closed in 2006 by the then Attorney-General and that was the end of it. Prayut was afraid of the rising conflicts. He then dissolved the religious committee of the reform council. However, Paiboon, Phra Suwit and Mano continued to address shortcomings of leading members of the Sangha Council through judicial means. In the meantime, the DSI investigated further, and it was discovered that a used vintage car in Wat Paknam's museum had not been properly registered, allegedly to evade taxes. Somdet Chuang was charged with tax evasion by the DSI, and the accusations were reason enough for the government to further postpone the appointment. Fear of Phra Suwit Dhiradhammo and his ties to the army may have played a role in this stalling. In December 2016, the National Legislative Assembly amended the 2005 Monastic Act to allow other monks than Somdet Chuang to be appointed Supreme Patriarch. Finally in February 2017, Somdet Amborn was appointed by King Vajiralongkorn to serve as the next Supreme Patriarch. (Note: In November 2016, the prosecutors decided not to charge Somdet Chuang, but to charge his attendant Luang Phi Pae instead, and another six people who had taken part in importing the vintage car. On 12 January 2017, however, the prosecutor issued a non-prosecution order against Luang Phi Pae, since the Department of Special Investigation had found no evidence of conspiring to evade taxes. The order indicated innocence on the part of Wat Paknam Bhasicharoen, the temple of Somdet Chuang. Paiboon responded to the outcome by giving several other reasons why he believed Somdet Chuang could not be Supreme Patriarch.)

=== Klongchan controversy ===
On 29 October 2015, the DSI stated that Supachai Srisuppa-aksorn, then chairman of the Klongchan Credit Union Cooperative (KCUC), had fraudulently authorized 878 cheques worth 11.37 billion baht, in which a portion totaling more than a billion baht was traced to Wat Phra Dhammakaya via donations. The problem had begun in April 2013, when it turned out that Supachai had borrowed too much money from the credit union for it to manage, and it had to freeze fifty thousand accounts, as well as postpone the payments to seventy-four creditors. The angered members held many protests and the credit union sued Supachai. The temple was implicated as well. In defense, spokespeople of Wat Phra Dhammakaya said that Luang Por Dhammajayo was not aware that the donations were illegally obtained because the temple lacked the means to check for illegally obtained money.

In 2015, in a written agreement with the credit union, supporters of the temple had raised 684 million baht linked to Wat Phra Dhammakaya to donate to the KCUC to compensate their members. The money was donated under the condition that the credit union would withdraw the charges, and the money would be returned to the temple if Supachai's donations to the temple were later proven legal.

In the meantime, Supachai was convicted and jailed, but more charges of embezzlement and fraud were still under investigation. Another 370 million baht linked to the temple was discovered as the Anti-Money Laundering Office and DSI investigated further. Donors of the temple donated the remaining 370 million baht to the credit union as well, (Note: The sum of the two amounts donated to the credit union did not exactly match the total amount of money that was traced to Wat Phra Dhammakaya, because it was argued by the temple's lawyers that twenty cheques had not actually reached Luang Por Dhammajayo.) but apart from the problem of compensation to the credit union, the DSI suspected Luang Por Dhammajayo of having conspired in the embezzlement of Supachai. The department then investigated two charges: conspiring to launder money and receiving stolen goods. The charges were laid by an affected client of the credit union, who felt the money the temple returned had too many strings attached. The temple denied the charges of the department, stating that donations were received in the open in public, and that Supachai had only donated cheques, no cash. They further explained that the temple had a department for financial matters, in which Supachai had no part, and accused the DSI of violating double jeopardy principles. The DSI stated that Supachai was likely to have been a financial assistant of the abbot, because he had admitted in court that the abbot was on friendly, informal terms with him.

Luang Por Dhammajayo was summoned to acknowledge the charges of ill-gotten gains and conspiring to money-laundering at the offices of the DSI. Spokespeople of the temple asked for postponement three times: the first time citing a busy schedule due to training programs, and after that the abbot's deep vein thrombosis. According to spokespeople, to travel to the DSI could mean a risk to Luang Por Dhammajayo's life. The temple requested the DSI to let him acknowledge his charges at the temple, a request the DSI refused. The DSI was skeptical of the temple's cited reasons and asked for a certificate from a physician, which the temple gave, but just as in 1999, discussions arose regarding the way the certification should be properly done. Moreover, the DSI concluded that Luang Por Dhammajayo was a flight risk and asked for an arrest warrant to take the abbot into custody. In the period the DSI issued an arrest warrant for the abbot, the temple was organizing a training program for women with thousands participants. Accused of organizing a human shield to prevent the DSI from entering, a spokesperson of the temple said that the only thing the temple would do to resist is "chanting and meditation".

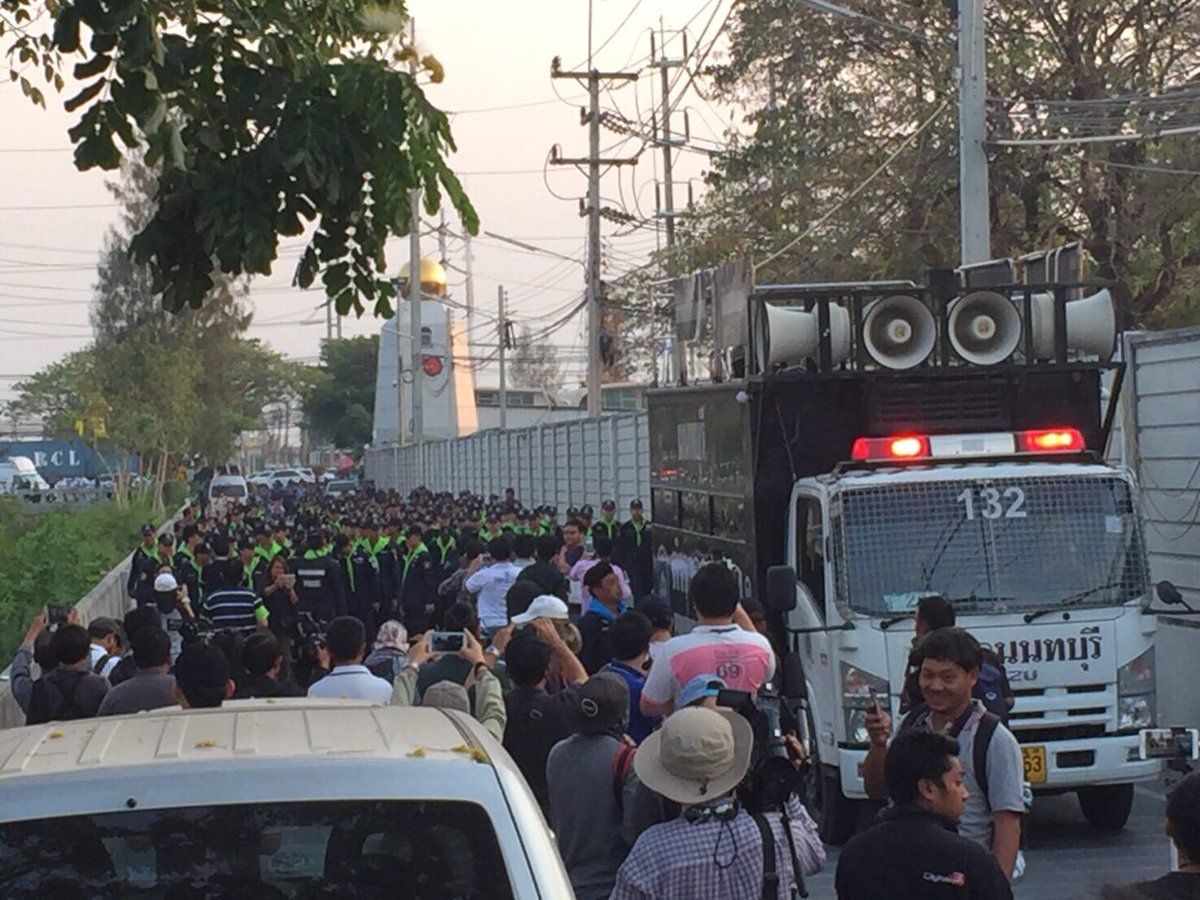
Police squadron prepares to enter Wat Phra Dhammakaya in a raid

In the meantime, news analysts, lawyers, current and former government officials of the Thai justice system, such as Seripisut Temiyavet, came out to state that the DSI was not handling the investigation of the temple with proper legal procedure. It was questioned why the DSI would not let the abbot acknowledge the charges at the temple, which many considered legitimate under criminal law. The DSI replied that they did not want to visit the abbot at the temple at this stage, because the temple was crowded with people, which could lead to conflict. A spokesperson of the temple also questioned why the DSI did not pursue lawsuits that were still running against Paiboon and Phra Suwit. Was the DSI biased because they received orders from someone not disclosed? The DSI had seen its independence questioned before, even by leading people within the department itself. In short, the temple's practitioners and spokespeople felt the charges were politically motivated, and had no confidence in the justice system under the junta. Moreover, they felt that if the former abbot would turn himself in, this would set a precedent for more baseless persecutions of other monks.

In June 2016, the DSI entered the temple to take Luang Por Dhammajayo in custody. However, a number of laypeople sitting silently in rows barred the DSI from continuing their search. The DSI, avoiding a confrontation, withdrew. A temple official was seen giving a press statement that the abbot would surrender himself "as soon as the state has become a democracy", enabling a fair judicial process. Even though the statement was later downplayed by temple's spokespeople as not representing the temple's official opinion, former senator Paiboon pointed out it reflected the temple's autonomy from the state. In reflection, news analysts concluded that the DSI did not really have the intention to arrest Luang Por Dhammajayo, but was simply surveying the temple grounds, or "playing political theatre" (Otago Daily Times).

After the standoff had taken place, tensions in social media rose, and the attorney-general stated that DSI should complete its investigations first, before further action could be taken. In the meantime, Luang Por Dhammajayo was ordered by a senior monk to step down as abbot temporarily, after Phra Suwit Dhiradhammo filed a request for suspension, citing Luang Por Dhammajayo's illness. It turned out, however, that Luang Por Dhammajayo had stepped down since 2011, but this was not widely known. It was then announced in the media that Luang Por Dattajivo was the acting abbot. In December, however, Phravitetbhavanacharn was appointed instead.

=== Junta's lockdown ===
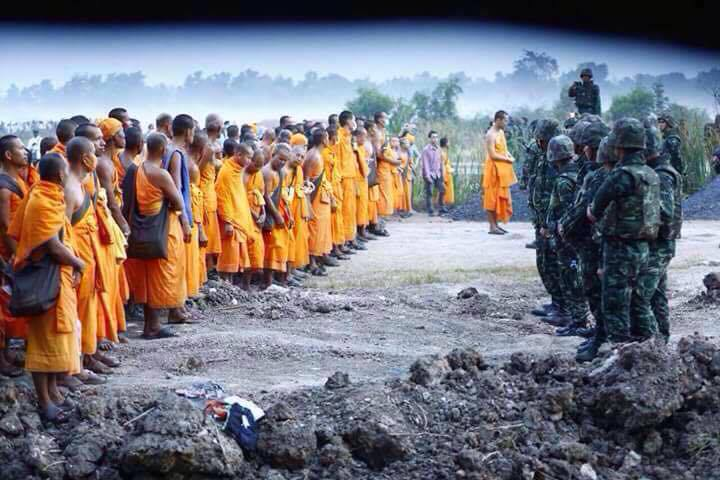
The junta's lockdown.

When it turned out that the prosecutors were slow to continue the Klongchan lawsuit with regard to Luang Por Dhammajayo, the DSI and several other police departments started to press charges against other people related to the temple. To further pressurize Luang Por Dhammajayo, the DSI also expanded its focus to branch centers of Wat Phra Dhammakaya. Branch centers in Nakhon Ratchasima, Chiang Mai, Kanchanaburi, Loei, and Tak were investigated and charged with encroaching on nature reserves. On 21 November, this finally led to another two arrest warrants, totaling three, and plans were made by the Thai police and the DSI to take Luang Por Dhammajayo into custody, through force if required.

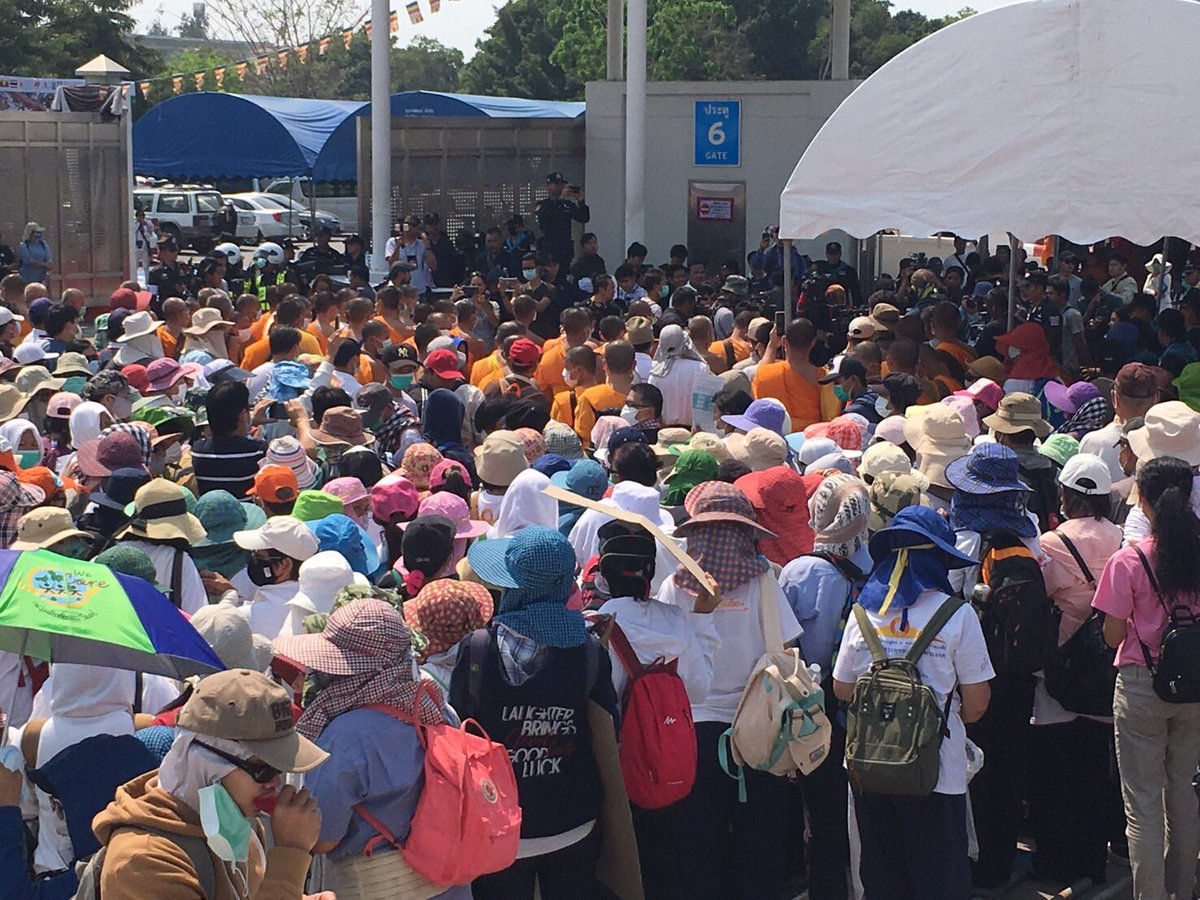
Crowd of people at Wat Phra Dhammakaya gates as police and soldiers surround the temple

A deal was proposed that if Luang Por Dhammajayo surrendered he would not be incarcerated and subsequently defrocked. Although the DSI agreed with such a guarantee at first, they later stated they could not give it because it was the jurisdiction of the court to decide on this. News analysts speculated that Thai law enforcement had not been able to arrest the abbot successfully, because of the complexity of the temple's terrain, the large number of practitioners, who continually adjusted their methods, and the imminent danger of a violent clash. Another reason brought up by news analysts was the Thai junta's concern for potential international backlash that could be generated from Wat Phra Dhammakaya's numerous international centers. In fact, international followers had already petitioned the White House and met with US Congressmen regarding the case. During the standoff, temple officials still affirmed that they were willing to cooperate with law enforcement, their only request being that the DSI give Luang Por Dhammajayo his charges at the temple due to his health. However, the police applied the method of "trimming the tree" by issuing hundreds of fines about gates, bridges, and other parts of the temple, to gradually get more control over the temple. As of March 2017, the Thai junta had laid 340 different charges against the temple and the foundation, including alleged forest encroachment and allegedly building the Ubosot illegally in the 1970s. While law enforcement was under growing pressure to get the job done, criticism against the operation grew as well, news reporters comparing the temple with Falun Gong in China or the Gulen Movement from Turkey.

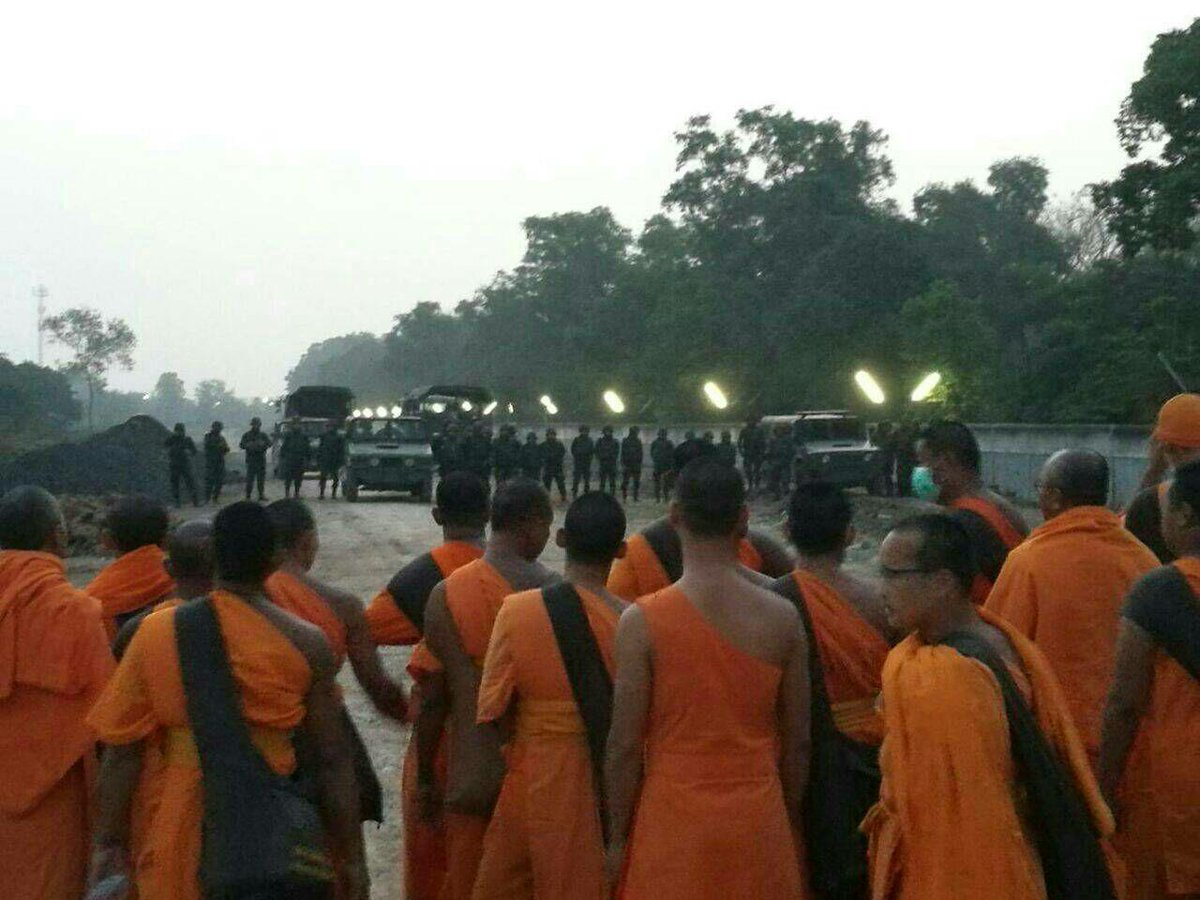
Monks at Wat Phra Dhammakaya prepare to meet incoming unit of military during the junta's lockdown

Meanwhile, the temple started a project to encourage people to chant the Dhammacakkappavattana Sutta, traditionally regarded as the first teaching of the Buddha. The activities at the temple were interpreted as methods to block law-enforcing officers from entering the terrain. On 9 December 2016, the television channel of the temple was therefore closed down to prevent the temple from further mobilizing supporters. In February 2017, four days after the appointment of the new Supreme Patriarch with no connections to the temple, junta leader Prayuth announced a special decree following the controversial Section 44 of the interim constitution. The section gave a carte blanche to law-enforcing authorities to get Luang Por Dhammajayo into custody through a wide range of means. The decree included heavy penalties against any person obstructing the arrest, and declaring the temple a restricted zone, which no-one could access or leave without the authorities' permission. A 4200-man combined task force of the DSI, police and army surrounded the temple and started to search every corner of the terrains. The temple showed little resistance. After two days, the task force reached the residence where the former abbot stayed, only to find it empty. Despite having searched every room and building in the temple, the authorities did not withdraw and ordered all non-residents of the temple to leave. Tensions increased, and though the temple staff was unarmed, they managed to use large crowds to push through the task force and a deal was brokered to allow lay people to come in the temple. On 22 February, an official negotiation followed, the DSI still pushing to remove all non-residents from the temple. The temple stated they had been sufficiently cooperative and pointed out that the task force had completed their search, resulting in a standoff and a siege of the temple by thousands of military personnel. In the meantime, the junta government stated they were not only looking for Luang Por Dhammajayo, but were also intending to reform the temple. This raised questions, and a lively national debate started as to what a "real temple" and "real Buddhism" should look like.

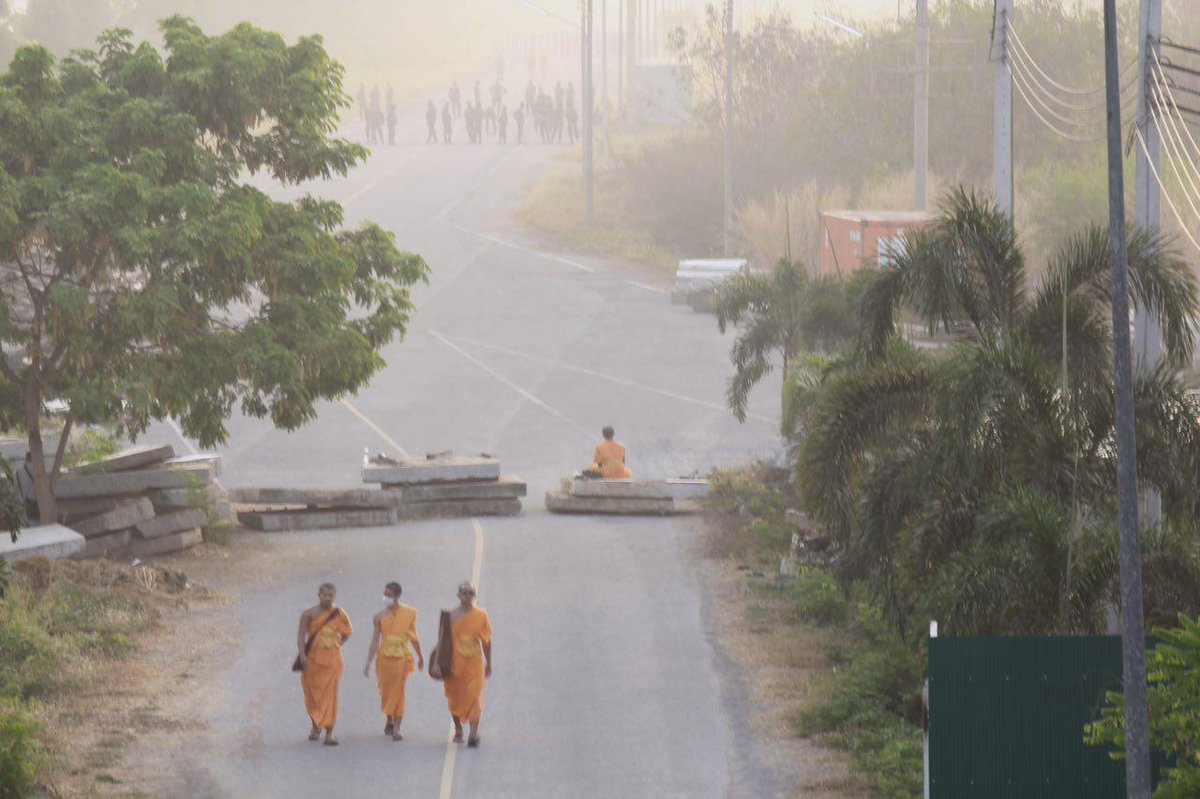
Monks at Wat Phra Dhammakaya during article 44 lockdown with soldiers surrounding the temple in the distance

The junta further increased its control on the temple by having the mobile signal in the temple area shut off, by barring reporters from entering the temple and by censoring and blocking a broadcast about the lockdown from Al Jazeera in Thailand. Criticism of the operation further increased when one man committed suicide and one asthma patient died during the operation. On 10 March 2017, a deal was made allowing authorities to search the temple once again on the condition that representatives of the Thai Human Rights Commission and news reporters were allowed to witness the search. Once again, authorities were not able to find the abbot, resulting in the junta ending the three-week occupation of the temple. However, section 44 still remained in effect, allowing the authorities to resume action against the temple at any time.

The lockdown resulted in a heated debate about section 44. The section was raised as an example of the junta's illegitimacy and unjust means, by the temple and many other critics. While proponents pointed out that all would be finished if Luang Por Dhammajayo only gave himself over to acknowledge the charges, critics pointed out that Luang Por Dhammajayo would be imprisoned and defrocked if brought into custody. News reporters compared the temple's resistance with the Burmese Saffron Revolution in 2007, some reporters expecting defeat soon, others a new opposition movement. Many reporters also questioned the practicality of using section 44 and so much resources to arrest one person for acknowledging a charge of a non-violent crime. It has been pointed out that it is more viable to try Luang Por Dhammajayo in absentia to determine guilt first.

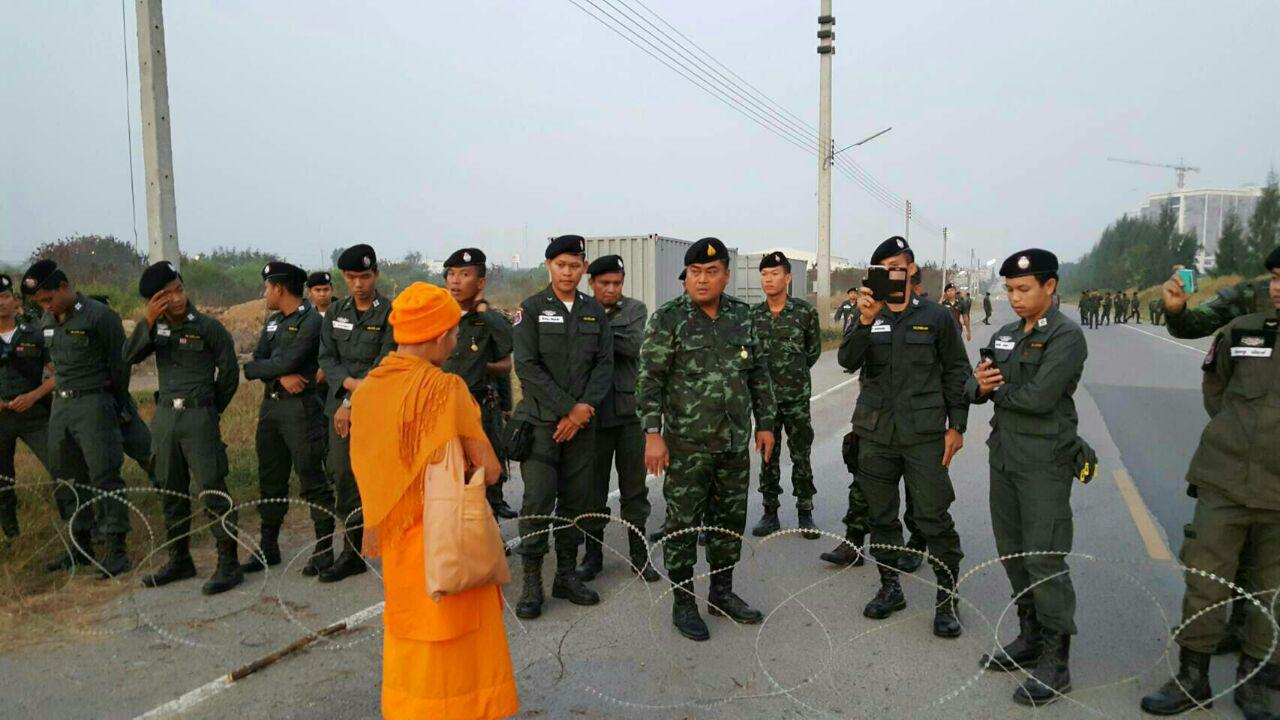
A Wat Phra Dhammakaya monk stands at the edge of a barbed wire barricade of the temple set up by the junta.

A few days before the lockdown was brought to a halt, it was announced in the Royal Thai Government Gazette that Luang Por Dhammajayo had his honorific title Phrathepyanmahamuni removed, because of the accusations he was charged with. The junta stated that after this announcement, they could and would immediately defrock Luang Por Dhammajayo if they were to find him.

In the middle of the lockdown of the temple, news reporting and social media activity about the event was very intensive. Writing for the liberal outlet Lok Wannee, a regular columnist argued that the response of government was similar to the aggressive anti-communist sentiment preceding the Thammasat University massacre on 6 October 1976. Kornkritch Somjittranukit from Prachatai expressed concern with the extent conservative news outlets such as Tnews and Manager Daily demonized the temple. He argued that this had a detrimental effect on society, raising as an example how the suicide of a devotee during the lockdown led many people on social media to express satisfaction.

=== Aftermath and revival ===
Following the end of the lockdown of the temple, the junta stated authorities will look for Luang Por Dhammajayo elsewhere. However, investigations against the temple continued. Just days after the end of the lockdown, additional charges were filed against people of Wat Phra Dhammakaya, this time also against the deputy abbot, Luang Por Dattajivo, for allegedly using the Klongchan Credit Union money to buy stocks and illegal land, something the temple dubbed "fake news". A Khao Sod columnist became critical of the new charges, stating that weeks after the accusations were made neither the justice system nor DSI had produced any form of evidence supporting the allegations, describing the accusations as "a new invention" and improbable, because the temple would have no need for such money. As of March 2017, the junta had summoned 317 people involved with the temple to report or acknowledge charges. With both Wat Phra Dhammakaya's honorary and deputy abbot under investigation, the junta has pushed for a replacement abbot for the temple, with the junta-appointed director of the National Office of Buddhism calling for an outsider to be appointed the temple's abbot. This attempt was unsuccessful however, because the Thai Sangha considered this the responsibility of the temple.

In December 2017, news outlets described a "revival" of the temple, as the temple unexpectedly assigned a new person as abbot. This was an assistant-abbot who until thus far had been unknown to the press: Phrakhru Sangharak Rangsarit. At the same time, the temple announced it would organize a new city pilgrimage in March 2018, though it would be less publicly visible than the previous ones.

While the temple was planning a comeback, on 20 December the DSI did an unannounced search at night to find the former abbot still missing. Three buildings were searched, but no traces were found. Regardless, the Klongchan lawsuits continued, and on 2 February 2018, the attorney requested the court to seize four bank accounts of the temple's two foundations. The KCUC objected to this, however, and finally the court ordered that the money on the accounts, 58 million baht, be given to the credit union instead. In June 2018, the junta seized a 1.46 billion baht building at Wat Phra Dhammakaya, alleging that it was built using Klongchan Credit Union money. In November 2018, the DSI filed additional charges once again of alleged money laundering, this time against a lay supporter who is the chair of the Dhammakaya Foundation. They proposed seizing most of the temple's properties and assets. In response, hundreds of thousands of the temple's followers returned over 3 million donation receipts to the temple to submit as evidence that the temple's properties were obtained through legal donations.

== See also ==
- Dhammakaya tradition
- Wat Paknam Bhasicharoen
- Wat Phra Dhammakaya
- Suppression of monasteries
