= Peace TV (Thailand) =

- Country: Thailand
- Broadcast area: Thailand, Southeast Asia (via satellite), Worldwide (via Internet)
- Headquarters: 281/1 Raminthra Road, Nuan Chan sub-district, Bueng Kum district, Bangkok, Thailand 10230

Programming
- Language(s): Thai
- Picture format: 576i (4:3 SDTV)

Ownership
- Owner: Peace Television Co., Ltd.

History
- Launched: 10 December 2013; 11 years ago (UDD TV); 1 September 2014; 10 years ago (Peace TV)
- Former names: UDD TV

Availability

Streaming media
- YouTube: Peace TV

Peace TV is a Thai television channel, notable for its support for liberal democracy. It is affiliated with United Front for Democracy Against Dictatorship (UDD). It is broadcast via satellite television (Thailand MVTV) and online streaming.

== History ==
Peace TV was launched on 10 December 2013 (Thai Constitution Day) as UDD TV (United Front for Democracy Against Dictatorship Television) after UDD leaders who had hosted programs on Asia Update until that station canceled the show due to the Criticism of Amnesty Act.

Until 20 May 2014 after the Army's martial law declaration during the 2013–2014 Thai political crisis UDD TV was forced to shut down along with other political TV channels until the 2014 Thai coup d'état. National Broadcasting and Telecommunications Commission invited closed political TV channels to register and make MOUs with NBTC. UDD TV was renamed to Peace TV and debuted station logo similar to Brazilian local TV Station TV Asa Branca. The logo is a rectangle and uses red-black-grey colour scheme. Peace TV launched on 1 September 2014.

Peace TV was closed down times, It closed from 10 to 16 April 2015 during Songkran Week. NBTC revoked its licence on 27 April 2015 but it relaunched on 21 July 2015 due to temporary protection from the administrative court. Peace TV filed litigation to the NBTC court.

It closed again from 21 July - 20 August 2016 during that year's constitutional referendum.

Peace TV closed once more from 11 August - 10 September 2017, when the junta claimed that "it broke the rules of the NCPO". It ceased broadcasting in 2021, although it continued to operate on YouTube and Facebook.

== Business model ==
Peace TV main revenue comes from commercials. Peace TV conducted a fundraising campaign to encourage viewers to donate money to support the station. It sells products such as herbal toothpaste and radio receivers.
