= Luang Por Dattajivo =

Thai Buddhist monk (born 1940)

Phadet Dattajivo
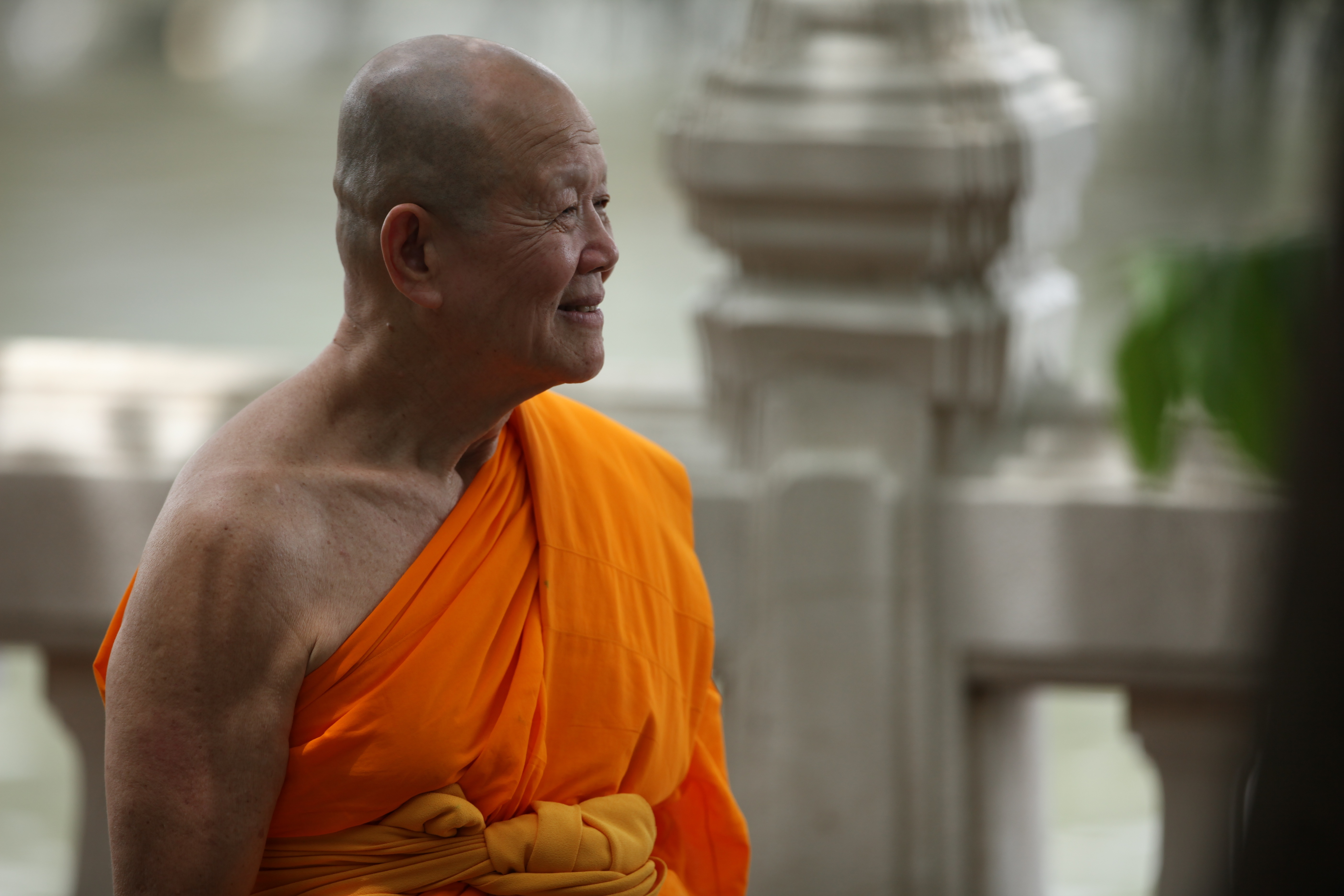
- Title: Most Venerable, Luang Por

Personal life
- Born: 21 December 1940 (age 85) Kanchanaburi, Thailand

Religious life
- Religion: Buddhism
- School: Theravada, Maha Nikaya
- Dharma name: Dattajivo

Senior posting
- Teacher: Chandra Khonnokyoong, Luang Por Dhammajayo
- Based in: Wat Phra Dhammakaya, Thailand

Luang Por Dattajivo (Thai: ทตฺตชีโว, RTGS: Thattachiwo; Pali: Dattajīvo; born 21 December 1940), also known by his birth name Phadet Phongsawat (Thai: เผด็จ ผ่องสวัสดิ์) and former ecclesiastical title Phrarajbhavanajahn (Thai: พระราชภาวนาจารย์, RTGS: Phra Rat Phawanachan), is a Thai Buddhist monk. He is the former deputy-abbot of Wat Phra Dhammakaya and the vice-president of the Dhammakaya Foundation, and was the observing abbot of the temple from 1999 until 2006, and again from 2011 until 2016. As of December 2016, he was still widely considered the de facto abbot. He met Mae chi (nun) Chandra Khonnokyoong and Luang Por Dhammajayo in his student years, and they have been his teachers throughout his life.

Luang Por Dattajivo was ordained in 1971, and quickly became a prolific author. He also took on a significant role in managing Wat Phra Dhammakaya. It was for this position that he was charged by the Thai military junta in 2017, when he refused to deliver Luang Por Dhammajayo to the authorities. This happened during the lockdown by the Thai junta, when abbot Luang Por Dhammajayo was sought for charges of receiving ill-gotten gains, charges which have been widely described as politically motivated.

== Early life ==
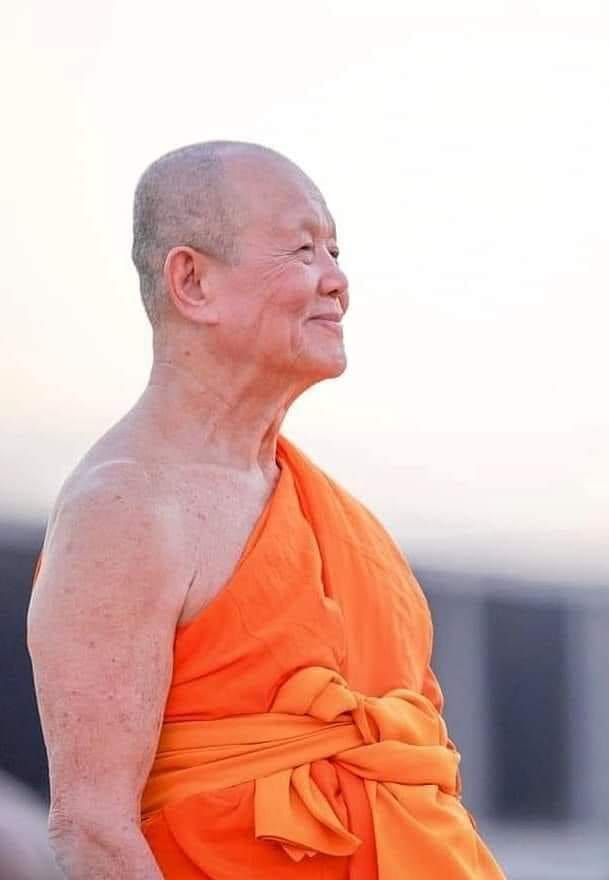
During a ceremony

Born Phadet Phongsawat in 1940 in Kanchanaburi, he had Vietnamese-Thai parents. Phadet graduated in agricultural science from Kasetsart University and studied in Australia at the post-graduate level.

Phadet became involved in Thai black magic at the age of seventeen. In his student years at Kasetsart University, he would often hold organized public demonstrations of black magic for his fellow students. In the biographies of Wat Phra Dhammakaya it is described that every time a junior student, Chaiyabun (who later became known as Luang Por Dhammajayo), came to watch one of Phadet's demonstrations, the magic would not work. Phadet therefore become curious about Chaiyabun's mental powers, and decided to test Chaiyabun by bringing him to his black magic teacher. But even the teacher could not use his powers in Chaiyabun's presence. Phadet therefore wanted to learn more about Chaiyabun and the meditation he practiced. He felt inspired by Chaiyabun's sincerity in meditation and his adherence to the Buddhist five precepts. This was a turning point in his life, and from that moment on he has always been Chaiyabun's student and assistant, and they developed a solid friendship. Phadet gave up the practice of black magic and through Chaiyabun met Mae Chi Chandra. He trained in meditation with Mae Chi Chandra for years.

In 1971, Phadet was ordained and became known as Luang Por Dattajivo, which means "He who gives his soul [to Buddhism]". By that time, Chaiyabun had already ordained as Luang Por Dhammajayo. In the opinion of a newspaper editor who wrote about the two monks, in the 1960s and 1970s, a university degree in Thailand was a guarantee someone would get a good position in society. Their decision to become ordained instead of pursuing a career therefore stood out.

== Life as a deputy abbot ==
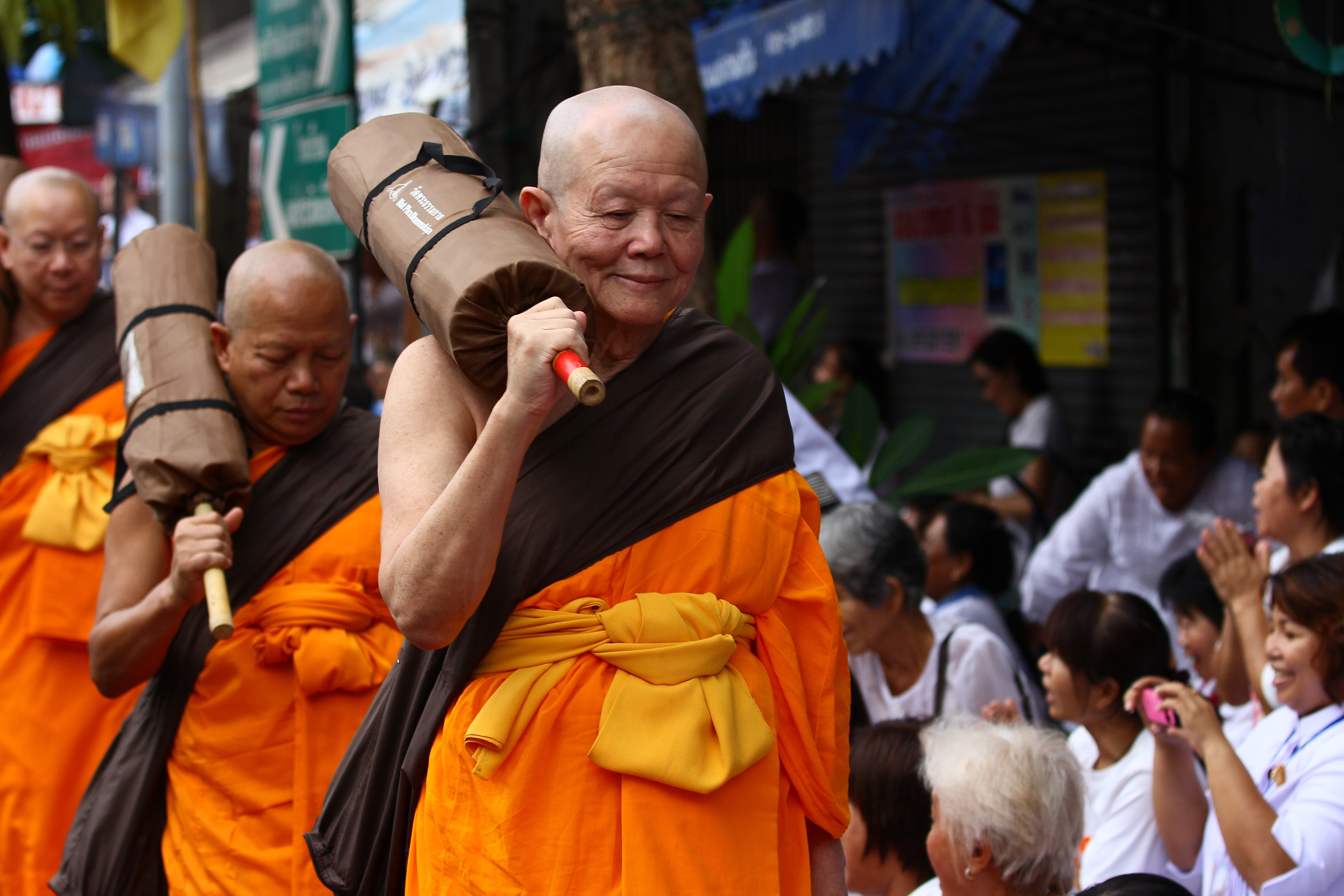
Luang Por Dattajivo walking in a procession, during the city pilgrimages in the early 2010s

When Wat Phra Dhammakaya was built in the 1970s and 1980s, Luang Por Dattajivo was in charge of the construction work. Furthermore, he helped develop the friendly relationships with the people living in the neighborhood of the temple, and was responsible for receiving guests at the temple. As a teacher, Luang por Dattajivo has spoken regularly before international audiences. For example, as a panelist at the United Nations General Assembly Special Session "World Summit for Social Development" in 2000 in Geneva, he highlighted the importance of spirituality in addressing social development and overcoming poverty. A prolific author, he has written many books published in Thai language, many of which have been translated into other languages than Thai. His books are often about contemporary problems, such as raising children in a modern society. A topic that he is known for is economics from a Buddhist philosophical point of view. He relates such "Buddhist economics" to personal development of qualities like mindfulness, simplicity and contentment.

In Wat Phra Dhammakaya, he is the person with the second most authority in the temple, next to Luang Por Dhammajayo. His character and organizational style complement Luang Por Dhammajayo in many ways. Mae Chi Chandra once stated that without Luang Por Dhammajayo and Luang Por Dattajivo, the founding of Wat Phra Dhammakaya would not have been possible. Luang Por Dattajivo is responsible for the day-to-day management of many of the temple's affairs and he is known for his informal character. He is also responsible for the management of international centers of Wat Phra Dhammakaya. He was made vice-president of the Dhamma Missionary Outreach Sector 8 and is the president of the Dhammakaya International Society of California. He was also observing abbot of Wat Phra Dhammakaya from 1999 to 2006, and again from 2011 to 2016. In December 2016, however, Phravitetbhavanacharn was appointed as observing abbot instead, though Luang Por Dattajivo was still widely considered the de facto abbot.

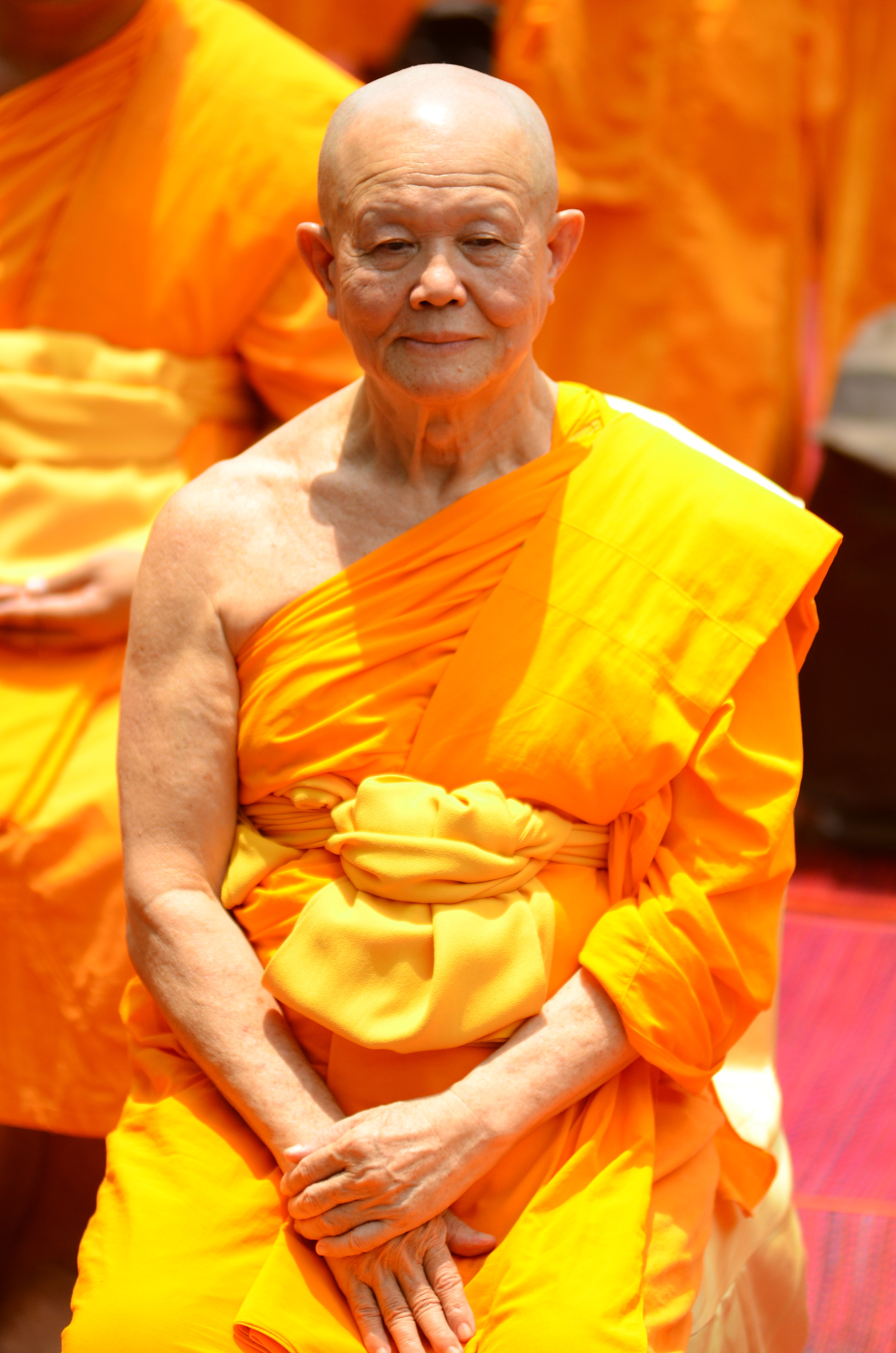
Luang Por Dattajivo in 2012

In 2016, under the military junta, Luang Por Dhammajayo was charged with conspiring in money-laundering and receiving ill-gotten gains from the chairman of a credit union. Wat Phra Dhammakaya denied the charges and stated they were politically motivated. When Luang Por Dhammajayo did not go and acknowledge the charges, the temple was sealed off in a lockdown. As the authorities were unable to find Luang Por Dhammajayo, they asked Luang Por Dattajivo to hand over Luang Por Dhammajayo. However, the temple released a press statement that they did not trust the authorities, and Luang Por Dattajivo did not show up for any negotiations. He was then charged for obstructing the authorities.

The charges laid against the temple and its abbot have been widely described as politically motivated, and considered part of the campaigns by the junta to remove any traces of the influence of former Prime President Thaksin Shinawatra, also known as the "de-Thaksinization" of Thailand.

Following the end of the lockdown of the temple, the junta stated authorities will look for Luang Por Dhammajayo elsewhere. However investigations against the temple continued. Just days after the end of the lockdown, additional charges were filed against Wat Phra Dhammakaya, this time against Luang Por Dattajivo, for allegedly using illegally obtained money to buy stocks and illegal land, something the temple dubbed "fake news". Some Thai news outlets, such as Khao Sod, became critical of the new charges, stating that weeks after the accusations were made neither the justice system nor DSI had produced any form of evidence supporting the allegations, describing the accusations as "a new invention" and improbable, because the temple would have no need for such money. Nevertheless, Luang Por Dattajivo has cooperated with the authorities, and as of March 2017, the lawsuits were still running, Luang Por fighting the charges.

Despite the charges, Luang Por still continued his duties, and led ceremonies for preparing construction for the Minnesota and Seoul branch temples.

== Recognition ==
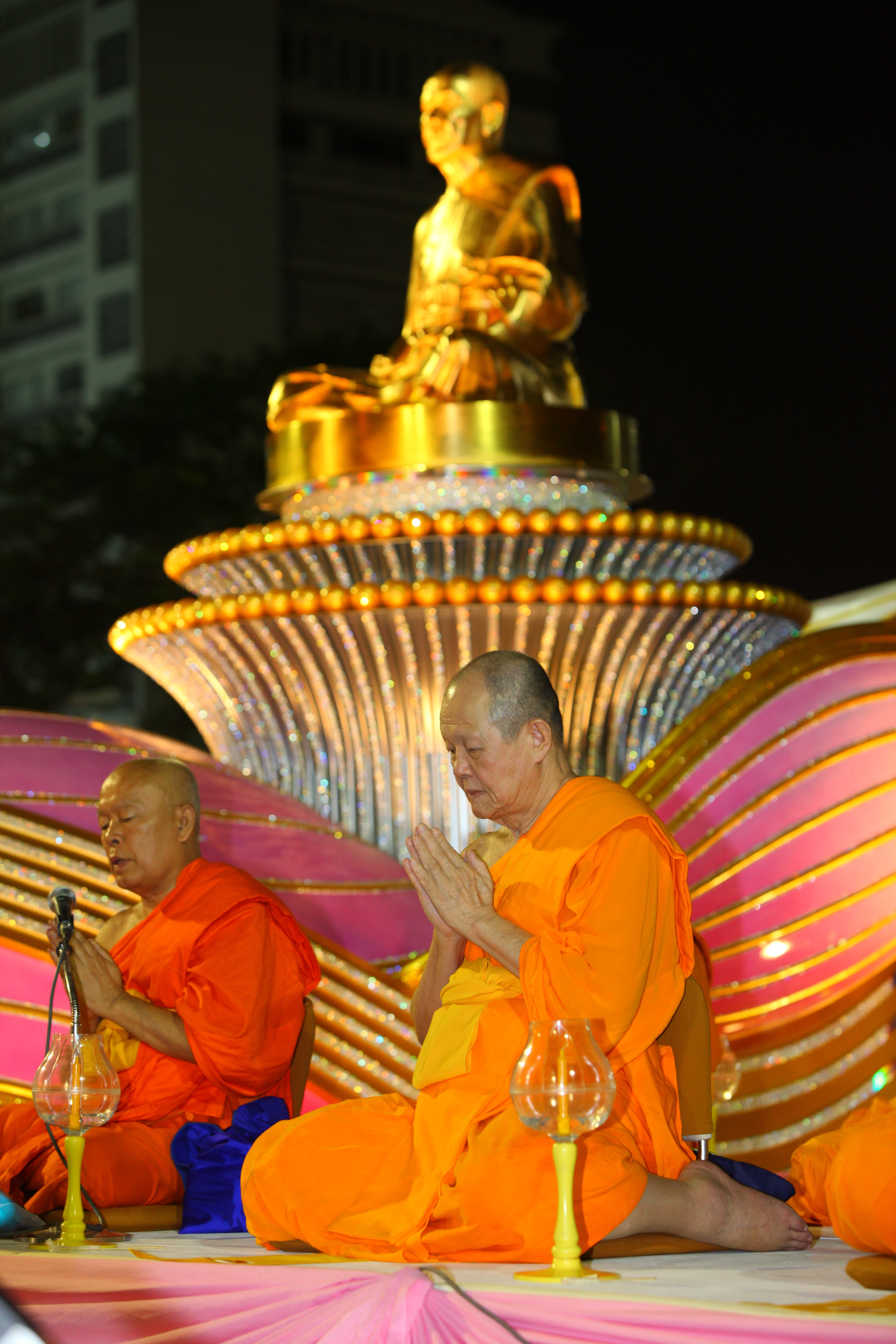
Luang Por Thongdi Suratecho and Luang Por Dattajivo presiding a ceremony together

Luang Por Dattajivo's work in Buddhist teaching was recognized when he received the ecclesiastical title "Phrabhavanaviriyakhun" in 1992, and later in 2013 "Phrarajbhavanajahn" from King Rama IX. However, in March 2017, King Rama X removed his title after he failed to acknowledge charges filed against him by the Thai police. Luang Por Dattajivo received the Dhammacakra Sema-Pillar award from Princess Sirindhorn in 1993. Furthermore, he received an honorary degree from the Mahachulalongkornrajavidyalaya University in 1994. In the 2010s, a stupa was built in his honor by Luang Por Dhammajayo, called the Phra Maha Cetiya Dattajivo.

== Publications in English ==
- Buddhist Ways to Overcome Obstacles (1992), translated by Pensri Kiengsiri. Khumson Books: Bangkok, ISBN 978-616-7200-00-2
- Blueprint for a Global Being (Buddhism in Plain English Series 1) (2000). Dhammakaya Foundation: Bangkok ISBN 978-974-87618-2-4
- The Buddha's First Teaching (Buddhism in Plain English Series 3) (2002). Dhammakaya Foundation: Bangkok ISBN 978-974-90587-3-2
- Reforming Society means Reforming Human Nature (Buddhism in Plain English Series 1) (2003). Dhammakaya Foundation: Bangkok ISBN 978-974-90996-1-2
- The Fruits of True Monkhood (Buddhism in Plain English Series 4) (2003). Dhammakaya Foundation: Bangkok ISBN 978-974-90587-1-8
- Vanijja Sutta: Cause of Over-target Benefit (2003). Thinkers and Writers for World Peace: Bangkok ISBN 978-974-90952-1-8
- The Ordination (2004). Thinkers and Writers for World Peace: Bangkok ISBN 978-974-92293-3-0
- Man's Personal Transformation (2005). Dhammakaya Foundation: Bangkok ISBN 978-974-8277-70-7
- How to Raise the Children to be Good People for the Nation (2005), compiled by Phra Treetep Chinungkuro. Thinkers and Writers for World Peace: Bangkok ISBN 974-93607-8-8
- Dhamma Talk by Phrabhavanaviriyakhun (2007). Rung Silp Printing: Bangkok
- Pages to Happiness (2007), compiled by S. Phongsawasdi. Thinkers and Writers for World Peace: Bangkok ISBN 978-974-09-3800-2
- Buddhist Economics (Buddhism in Plain English Series 2) (2010). Dhammakaya Foundation: Patumthani ISBN 978-616-7200-11-8
- Training the Trainers, part 1 (2012). Rung Silp Printing: Bangkok. Archived from the original on 12 March 2017.

== See also ==
- Buddhist economics
