= Mano Laohavanich =

Thai professor and politician (born 1956)

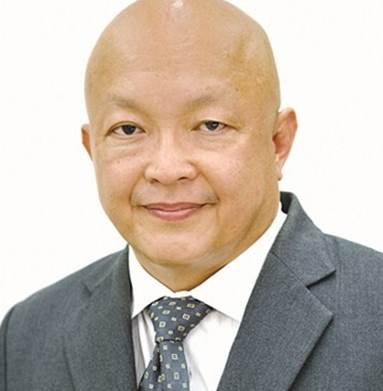
Mano Laohavanich

Mano Laohavanich (Thai: มโน เลาหวณิช, RTGS: Mano Laohawanit; monastic name Mettanando Bhikkhu) is a Thai politician, former professor of Buddhism at Thammasat University, and former Buddhist monk. He is most famous for his public statements against Wat Phra Dhammakaya, the largest Buddhist temple in Thailand.

Mano was born in 1956 and attended several competitive schools in Thailand in his childhood. After graduating from Chulalongkorn University he ordained as a Buddhist monk at Wat Paknam Bhasicharoen in 1982. While still a monk, Mano studied abroad and earned degrees from Oxford, Harvard and Hamburg University. He later returned to Thailand and stayed at Wat Phra Dhammakaya for two years before leaving in 1994, with Mano and Wat Phra Dhammakaya giving highly conflicting accounts about his time there. Afterwards Mano published various Buddhist scholarly works while moving around different temples in Bangkok. Mano's theories were often considered unorthodox and the cause of major controversy in Thailand, leading to Mano leaving the monkhood in 2007. He then became a professor at Thammasat University.

Following the 2014 coup d'etat, Thailand's newly established military junta appointed Mano to its National Reform Council, a committee the ruling junta described as preparing Thailand for return to democracy. After his appointment Mano appeared in the Thai media extensively, criticizing various groups including Wat Phra Dhammakaya in a manner critics described as 'fake news'. Mano was later also hired as a special consultant by Thailand's Department of Special Investigation during the 2016–17 legal case against the honorary abbot of Wat Phra Dhammakaya, Luang Por Dhammajayo. Following his work on the military junta's National Reform Council, Mano began a political campaign as secretary-general of the Prachachon Patiroob (People Reform Party), a pro-junta political party that advocated military dictator Prayut Chan-O-Cha remaining in power after the 2019 Thai general election.

== Early life and monkhood ==
Mano Laohavanich was born May 17, 1956, his mother was a pharmacist and his father a medical doctor. Mano attended primary school at Assumption College, a private all-boys Catholic school, and then later went to study at Triam Udom Suksa School, a competitive upper-secondary school in Thailand. Mano went on to Chulalongkorn University where he studied medicine.

Mano's first encounter with Wat Phra Dhammakaya was in 1973, at the age of sixteen, when he attended part of a training program hosted by the temple, although he would not start attending the temple regularly until 1975. (Note: Mano later claimed he was actually a founding member of Wat Phra Dhammakaya. If this was true, he would have had to have been 13 years old when founding the temple.)

While Mano did end up receiving his medical degree, he later ordained as a Buddhist monk in lieu of pursuing a medical career. He ordained at Wat Paknam Bhasicharoen in April 1982. After ordaining as a Buddhist monk, Mano went on to study abroad, earning degrees in Indian literature and theology at Oxford and Harvard University, financed by Wat Phra Dhammakaya.

After several years abroad, Mano returned to Thailand and spent two years at Wat Phra Dhammakaya in Pathum Thani before moving to another temple in 1994. Despite the fact that Mano is most famous for his public statements against the temple he lived at during this time, accounts of his time there have been disputed. Wat Phra Dhammakaya's account of the outspoken critic's time at the temple describes Mano as a self-absorbed "narcissist" who regularly got into conflicts with other monks at the temple. In contrast, Mano has claimed that he was a "founding member" and a "top leader" at Wat Phra Dhammakaya, as well as "a rising star envied by other followers".

The reason Mano left the temple has also been disputed, according to statements from Wat Phra Dhammakaya, he left due to several conflicts and because he didn't fit in with the temple culture. Mano, however, has given differing reasons as to why he left the temple, one time stating he left because the other monks at the temple developed jealousy toward him, and then another time claiming he left because Luang Por Dhammajayo allegedly tried to convince him he was God. On another occasion, he claimed to have left due to disagreements over Wat Phra Dhammakaya's financial practices, and then on another occasion, Mano claimed he left the temple because he allegedly found out the temple was acquiring weapons. On another occasion, he claimed he left because he allegedly found out that Luang Por Dhammajayo had invested in various unnamed companies, including an unnamed machine gun manufacturer.

After leaving Wat Phra Dhammakaya in 1994, Mano moved to Wat Rajorasarama. He later left this temple as well and stayed at other temples in Bangkok before leaving monkhood completely in 2007. After disrobing, Mano ran an unsuccessful bid for the Thai parliament in the 2007 Thai General Election as a member of the Chart Thai Party. He later took a position as a professor at Thammasat University.

== Legal case of Johnathan Doody ==
One incident that Mano was particularly famous for being involved in was the case of Johnathan Doody, a suspect in the Arizona Buddhist temple shooting in 1991. As a result of this bloody shooting, Doody was convicted in 1994 of armed robbery and the murder of nine people, including six monks.

While still a monk, Mano took a deep interest in the case from its onset, promoting the idea that Doody was innocent. Mano cited aspects of the investigation as well as cultural reasons as to why Doody could not have committed the crime. Mano stated that "[i]t was inconceivable that a person born of Thai parents would commit such a crime against monks" and published several writings on the case arguing for Doody’s innocence. Still as a monk, Mano even raised money from lay people from numerous temples for Doody's appeal, which sparked criticism from some senior monks.

In 2008, Doody's conviction was overturned on the basis that his confession was not voluntary. The next trial resulted in a mistrial.

In 2014, a third trial concluded that Doody was indeed guilty on all counts, including armed robbery and all nine murders and was sentenced to nine life terms in prison.

== Scholarly works ==
Mano was known for having some unorthodox interpretations of the Tripitaka. While he was living at Wat Rajorasaram, he published an article speculating that the Buddha died of a blood disease brought on by eating too much, rather than by food poisoning. This caused disputes with Thai authorities at the time, who considered the publication harmful to Buddhism. This, as well as some of Mano's other theories, resulted in authorities taking away his monastic ID card, effectively forcing him to leave the monkhood.

Something that achieved much attention was Mano's publications on ordained Buddhist nuns, or bhikkhuni. Like some other scholars, Mano believes the Eight Garudhammas, eight restrictions that only apply to bhikkhunis, may not have been the actual words of the Buddha, but were later additions. However, Mano claims that these were added much earlier than what most other scholars who argue this believe, during the First Buddhist Council. He has speculated that two of the Buddha's principal disciples, Mahakassapa and Ananda, may have been rivals who competed for the existence of the bhikkhuni order. In 2007, Mano stated:

Perhaps Mahakassappa and the bhikkhus of that time were jealous of the bhikkhunis being more popular and doing more teaching and social work than the bhikkhus. Their anti-women prejudice became institutionalized at that time with the eight garudhammas, the eight weighty restrictions. We must discontinue that prejudice.

Mano claims that, with the exception of Ananda, that Mahakassapa and all of the other monks at the First Buddhist Council were not really Arahants, or fully enlightened beings, as the Pali Canon states. Mano states that the true reason for the First Buddhist Council wasn't actually to compile the Tripitaka, but instead, was a conspiracy by Mahakassapa and all of the other 498 monks at the council to get rid of the female order of bhikkhunis. Mano argues that the Eight Garudhammas were added by the monks at the First Buddhist Council in order to "eliminate the order of nuns completely and rapidly".

=== Criticism ===
Mano Laohavanich's scholarly works (often penned under his monastic name, Mettanando Bhikkhu) have been the subject of some major controversy in Thailand, resulting in his expulsion from multiple temples in Thailand and his eventual departure from monkhood. In 2003, following the publication of his theory on Bhikkhuni, Mano said of himself that he "may be the most controversial figure in Thai Buddhism at present". The monastic scholar P. A. Payutto, also known as Somdet Phra Buddhakosajarn, accuses Mano of manipulating facts to mislead people. An example Venerable Payutto cites with regard to Mano's book, It Started in the Year 1 B.E., is that one person in the book (Mr. Plong) had never traveled to a free country, which in the context was misleading readers into thinking he must have traveled only to communist countries. In reality, the person mentioned had never traveled to any foreign country.

Payutto has also criticized Mano's scholarly works as not being based on verifiable evidence, stating that Mano Laohavanich's writing "has no references or meaningfulness, and is thus harmful [to Buddhism]". Payutto calls Mano's scholarly works a type of "academic mysticism", in which he finds bits of information and makes up logic without investigating the meaning. Such "academic mysticism" is enjoyable among intellectuals, states Payutto, because it lets their imaginations run wild and allows them to reason out any conclusion they want, with no way for their speculations to be proven wrong. However, Payutto argues that this practice distorts people's ability to decipher the truth and damages real scholarship.

== Political controversies ==
Mano Laohavanich is well known for his controversial accusations against Wat Phra Dhammakaya, one of the temples he used to live at when he was still a monk. These accusations increased in number substantially following the 2014 coup d'état. After the coup, Mano was appointed a member of the National Reform Council, a council set up by the military junta to reform Thailand, explained as preparing the country for democratic elections. Since his appointment by the Thai Junta, Mano has contributed significantly to news reports, described by critics such as news outlet Matichon as 'unsubstantiated claims' (Thai: ข่าวลือ), criticizing former Thai Rak Thai party members, Wat Phra Dhammakaya, and other groups the ruling junta was generally seen being as opposed to.

Mano has made several controversial remarks about his former temple, Wat Phra Dhammakaya. He gave a contested account of the temple's teachings, claiming the temple had a secret "esoteric" doctrine that is only taught to inner members. Mano has given differing accounts of this alleged secret teaching, one time claiming it was secretly taught that Wat Phra Dhammakaya's honorary abbot, Luang Por Dhammajayo, was a "reincarnation of the Buddha", and then another time claiming it was secretly taught he was "the creator of Nibbana". Mano also gave a disputed biography of the life of Luang Por Dhammajayo including allegations that he was a secret Nazi sympathizer and an admirer of Adolf Hitler. Mano also made claims that Luang Por Dhammajayo wants to conquer the world.

Mano has also stated that Wat Phra Dhammakaya is a threat to Thailand's military junta and that the temple had been secretly stockpiling weapons. After the claims were made, temple officials allowed news reporters to search the temple for the alleged contraband, and none were found.

On several occasions, Mano claimed that the temple publicly supports the Red-Shirt movement and that the temple allegedly told visitors to vote for its allied parties, also claiming that Luang Por Dhammajayo wrote a song in praise of former Prime Minister Thaksin Shinawatra that aired on the temple's 24-hour television station, although this supposed airing was never confirmed. He has also claimed that the temple teaches that the former prime minister was the reincarnation of 18th century Siamese king Taksin. However, scholars and political commentators are not in agreement as to whether the temple has any political connection. Several major supporters of the temple are also publicly known as members of the Yellow Shirts political pressure group, which strongly oppose PM Thaksin.

In an interview with the Bangkok Post, Mano gave a disputed account of the layout of Wat Phra Dhammakaya, stating that the temple possesses a secret escape tunnel that only Luang Por Dhammajayo knows about, a heavily fortified luxury residence with expensive furniture guarded by five hundred monks, a "cyber command centre" with six hundred "cybertroops", and a fortified safe house that holds a stash of gold and treasure. Despite a large scale search operation by authorities, officials did not report any of the items Mano alleged the temple to have had. Officials did initially report finding a tunnel, however this was later confirmed to be an underground water facility. In drawing a comparison with the persecution of Falun Gong in China, Voice TV journalist Kham Paka mentioned they were also accused of having a secretive tunnel complex, and Paka continued to list several other similarities with Wat Phra Dhammakaya, both in accusations made and prosecution methods used by government officials.

On Thai Rath TV, Mano claimed that Wat Phra Dhammakaya invented a new "high-tech" communication device to mobilize devotees, the device mentioned was later confirmed to have been a tally counter followers were using for mantra meditation.

During the 2016–17 Klongchan Credit Union case against Luang Por Dhammajayo, Mano submitted letters to DSI and held interviews with Thai press calling for an expedition of the case by the Thai Justice Department. This was met with backlash and threat of legal action from board members of the affected credit union, who did not support the case. In regards to the same case, Mano also claimed that the honorary abbot had a lifetime visa to the United States and was planning to flee before trial. However, the United States discontinued and invalidated all lifetime visas to the country over a decade ago in the early 2000s. Thai authorities also later confirmed that there was no record of the honorary abbot even having a passport.

On a similar note, in January 2017, Mano claimed that Luang Por Dhammajayo secretly left Wat Phra Dhammakaya along with a secret stockpile of gold and jewels in one of several shipping containers spotted. He later contradicted this claim the following month and stated that the honorary abbot was still inside the temple.

== Political career ==
Following his work on the Thai military junta's National Reform Council, Mano began a political campaign for the 2019 Thai general election. The bid would be the first political bid Mano has made since his unsuccessful campaign in 2007.

In 2018, Mano joined the newly formed Prachachon Patiroob (People Reform Party) led by Paiboon Nititawan, who led the religious committee of the junta's National Reform Council with Mano after the 2014 coup d'etat. Mano himself was selected as secretary-general of the party. The party supports the continued rule of Thailand's 2014 military junta under military dictator Prayut Chan-O-Cha and has the reform of the Buddhist clergy in Thailand as a central part of its platform. During the campaign, the party was investigated for using Buddhism for political advertisement but was cleared by the Thai Election Commission. The party originally won no seats in the 2019 Thai general election with only 40,000 votes, but after the Thai Election Commission controversially changed the formula in how seats were awarded after the election results were announced, the party gained one seat, allowing the junta-backed Palang Pracharat party to form a coalition government and control the lower house of Parliament with the extra seats.

In August 2019, the People Reform Party was dissolved and merged with the military backed Palang Pracharat Party.

== Bibliography ==
- Mettanando Bhikkhu (1994). Meditator's handbook, Bangkok: Dhammakaya Foundation. ISBN 9748920925
- Mettanando Bhikkhu (2545 [2002]). Hēt kœ̄t Phō̜. Sō̜. 1, Krung Thēp: Samnakphim Phraʻāthit. ISBN 9749029380
- Mettanando Bhikkhu; Hinueber, Oskar von (2000), "The Cause of the Buddha's Death" (PDF), Journal of the Pali Text Society, XXVI: 105–118, archived from the original (PDF) on 9 April 2015

== See also ==
- Wat Phra Dhammakaya
- Luang Por Dhammajayo
- National Council for Peace and Order
- Jerome Corsi
