= Luang Por Dhammajayo =

Thai Buddhist monk

Dhammajayo
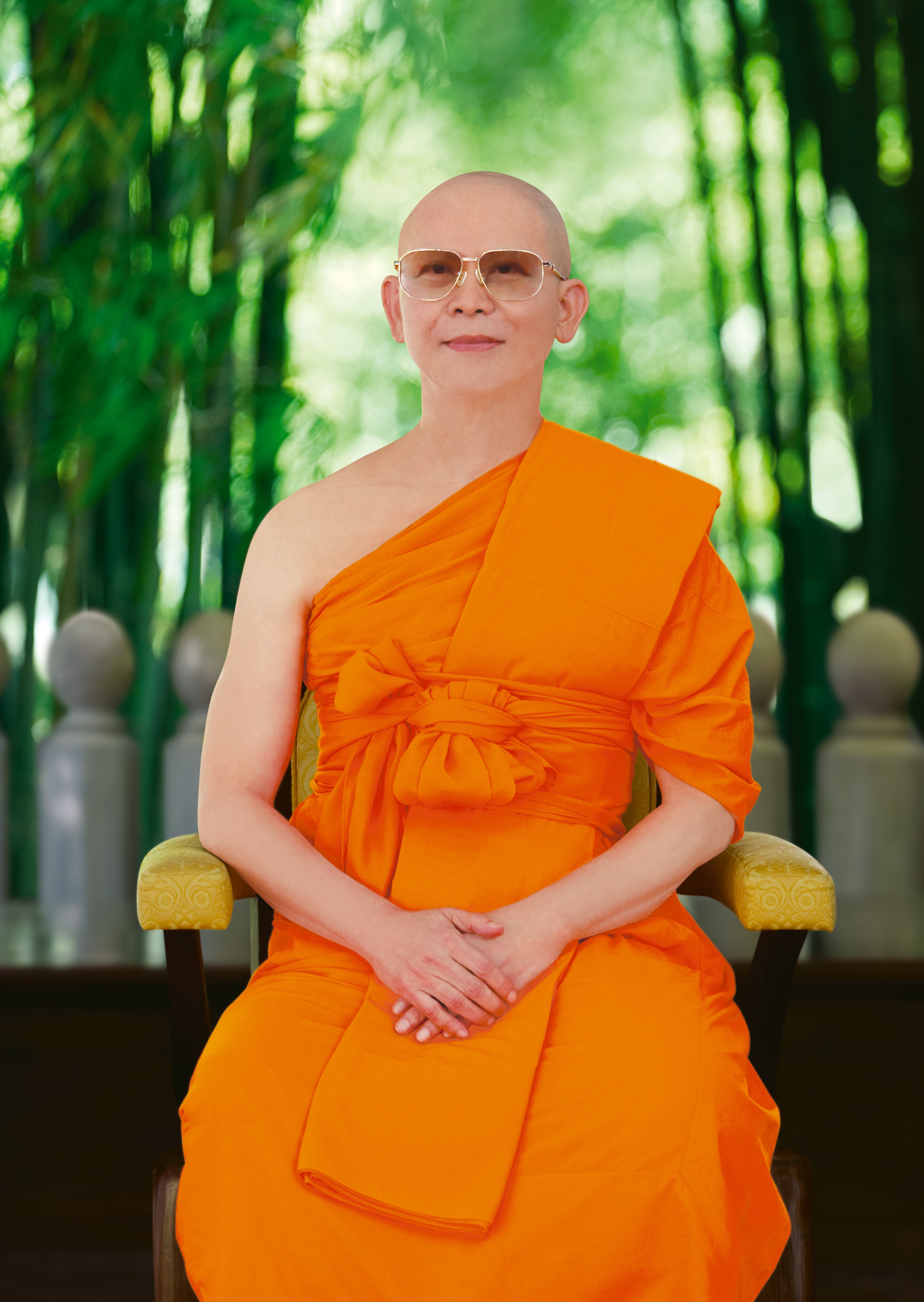
- Luang Por Dhammajayo, taken in the old section of Wat Phra Dhammakaya
- Title: Honorary Abbot of Wat Phra Dhammakaya

Personal life
- Born: 22 April 1944 (age 82) Sing Buri, Thailand

Religious life
- Religion: Buddhism
- School: Theravada, Maha Nikaya
- Lineage: Wat Paknam Bhasicharoen
- Dharma name: Dhammajayo

Senior posting
- Teacher: Luang Pu Sodh Candasaro, Chandra Khonnokyoong
- Based in: Wat Phra Dhammakaya, Pathum Thani, Thailand

Military service
- Website: Biography of Luang Por Dhammajayo

Luang Por Dhammajayo (Thai: ธมฺมชโย, RTGS: Thammachayo, Luang Por being a deferential title; born 22 April 1944), also known by the lay name Chaiyabun Suddhipol, is a Thai Buddhist monk. He was the abbot of the Buddhist temple Wat Phra Dhammakaya, the post he held until 1999 and again from 2006 to December 2011. In December 2016, he was given the post of honorary abbot of the temple. He is a student of the nun (maechi) Chandra Khonnokyoong, and is the most well-known teacher of Dhammakaya meditation. He has been subject to criticism and government scrutiny. However, he continues to be a spiritual leader who has significant influence in Thai society. Luang Por Dhammajayo's approach to Buddhism seeks to combine the ascetic and meditative life with modern personal ethics and social prosperity.

Luang Por Dhammajayo met Maechi Chandra in his student years, and learnt about Buddhism from her. During his student years, he met a fellow student who later became known as Luang Por Dattajivo. Luang Por Dhammajayo started teaching together with Maechi Chandra, and in 1970, they started their own temple in Pathum Thani province, later called Wat Phra Dhammakaya.

The temple became extremely popular in the 1980s. However, from the 1997 Asian financial crisis onward, the temple and Luang Por Dhammajayo came under heavy criticism for unorthodox fundraising methods, culminating in several charges against him. The charges were withdrawn in 2006, and Luang Por Dhammajayo revived the temple. He organized several notable activities in this period, including a campaign against smoking and drinking for which he was rewarded by the World Health Organization.

After the 2014 coup d'état, Luang Por Dhammajayo again was charged by the Thai government, by then a military junta, for conspiring in money-laundering and receiving stolen goods. These charges have been widely described as politically motivated, but did lead to an arrest warrant and highly publicized standoff in 2017. The junta was, however, unable to find Luang Por Dhammajayo. As of December 2017, the whereabouts of Luang Por Dhammajayo was still unknown, with Phrakhru Sangharak Rangsarit being assigned as official abbot instead.

== Biography ==
=== Early life and background ===
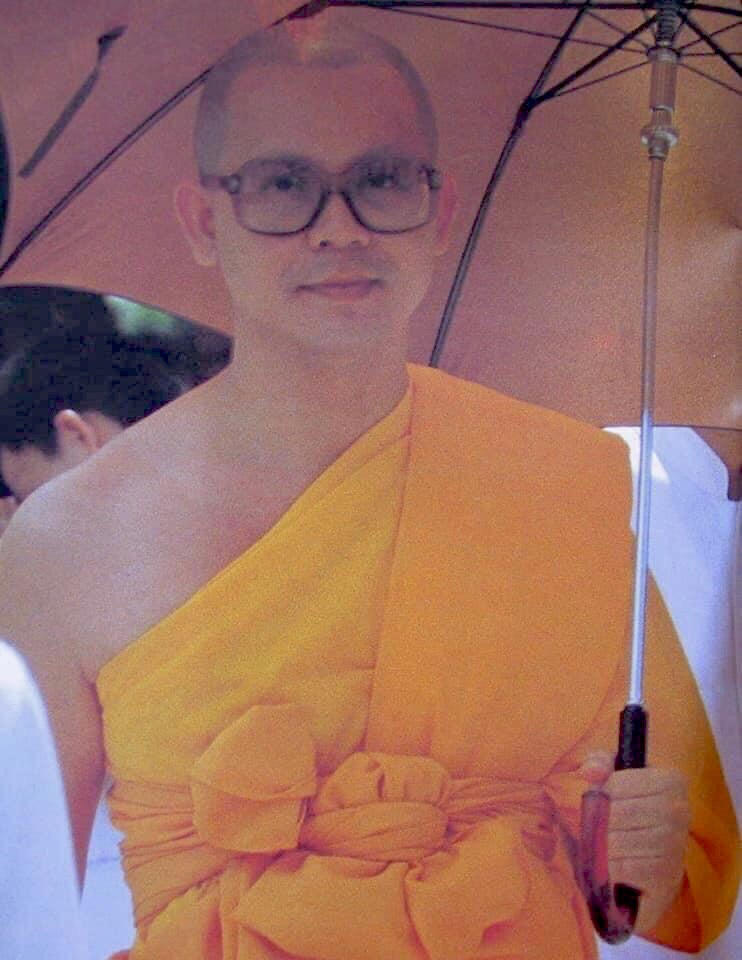
Luang Por Dhammajayo in early years

Luang Por Dhammajayo was born in Sing Buri Province with the lay name Chaiyabun Sutthiphon on 22 April 1944, to Janyong Sutthiphon (his father) and Juri Sutthiphon (his mother). His parents were Lao Song and Thai-Chinese, and separated when he was young. Chaiyabun was raised by his father, who was an engineer working for a government agency. Due to a sensitivity for sunlight, Chaiyabun had to wear sunglasses from a young age.

In Wat Phra Dhammakaya's publications, Chaiyabun is described as a courageous child, who would often play dangerous games with his friends. Whilst studying at Suankularb Wittayalai, the owner of the school would bring Chaiyabun to meet with monks regularly. This sparked his interest in Buddhism from a young age. He set up a Buddhist Youth Society together with his fellow students. Chaiyabun developed a strong interest in reading at a young age, especially on Buddhist practice and biographies of leading people in the world, both religious and political. This included a book with teachings from Luang Pu Sodh Candasaro, the founder of the Dhammakaya Tradition, and a magazine about the maechi (nun) Chandra Khonnokyoong.

In 1963, while studying economics at Kasetsart University, he started visiting the temple Wat Paknam Bhasicharoen. It was here that he first met Maechi Chandra, a student of abbot Luang Pu Sodh Candasaro, who had by then died. Maechi Chandra was able to answer Chaiyabun's questions, which made him curious to learn more about Buddhism, through the practice of meditation. Under Maechi Chandra's supervision, Chaiyabun attained a deeper understanding of Buddhism.

Chaiyabun got to know many fellow students both in Kasetsart University and in other universities who were interested in practicing meditation, and encouraged them to join him in learning meditation with Maechi Chandra. One of these early acquaintances later became a Buddhist monk and Luang Por Dhammajayo's assistant: Phadet Phongsawat, now known as Luang Por Dattajivo, who would become the deputy abbot of Wat Phra Dhammakaya. When Chaiyabun met Phadet, Phadet was involved in occult practices (Thai: ไสยศาสตร์), and would often hold public demonstrations of such practices for his fellow students. In Wat Phra Dhammakaya's biographies it is told that every time Chaiyabun joined to watch one of Phadet's demonstrations, Phadet was incapable of doing his performance. Phadet therefore became curious about Chaiyabun, suspecting that Chaiyabun was affecting his occult demonstrations. Later on, when Phadet tried to persuade Chaiyabun to drink alcohol at a college party, Chaiyabun refused, citing his adherence to the five Buddhist precepts. To test Chaiyabun, Phadet then decided to bring him to his occult black magic teacher. However, even the teacher could not use his powers in Chaiyabun's presence, which convinced Phadet to learn more about Dhammakaya meditation from Chaiyabun. From that moment on, they remained friends and Phadet became Chaiyabun's assistant.

=== Ordination as monk ===
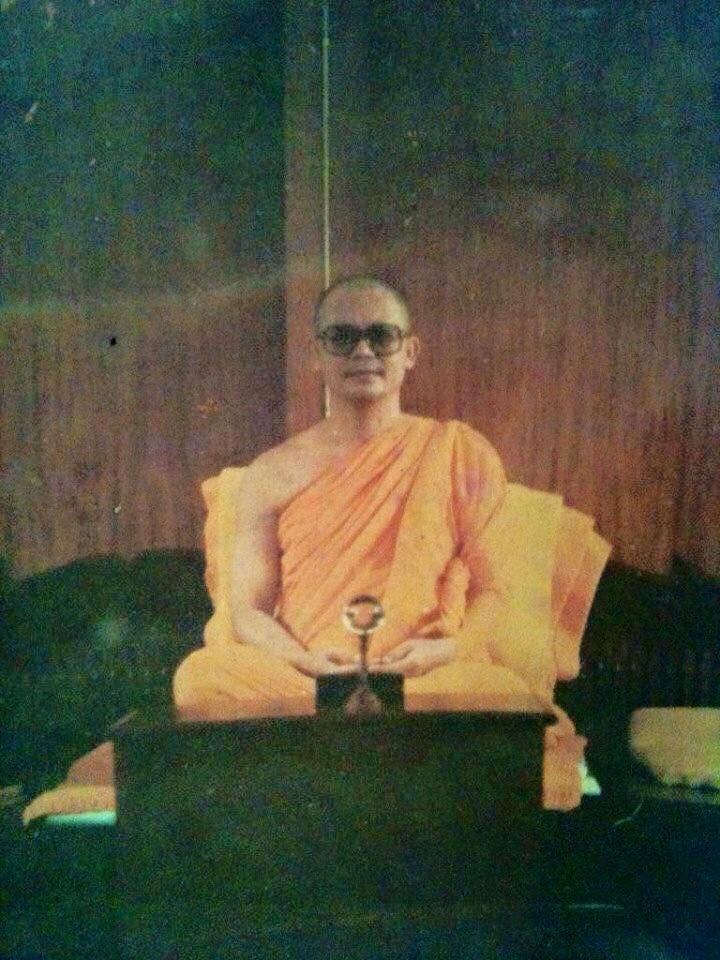
Luang Por Dhammajayo on a teaching seat

During his university years, Chaiyabun wanted to stop his studies in order to ordain as a monk. However, Maechi Chandra and Chaiyabun's father persuaded him to finish his degree first. They argued that Chaiyabun could do more benefit to society if he was both knowledgeable in mundane and spiritual matters. During university, he took a lifelong vow of celibacy as a birthday gift to Maechi Chandra, inspiring many of her students to do the same. After his graduation from Kasetsart University, he was ordained at Wat Paknam Bhasicharoen on 27 August 1969. He received the monastic name "Dhammajayo", meaning 'The victor through Dhamma'. At his ordination, Phra (meaning 'monk, venerable') Dhammajayo took a vow that he would work to bring progress to Buddhism. A university degree in the Thailand of the 1960s could lead to a good job and social standing, making Chaiyabun's decision to ordain uncommon.

Once ordained, he started teaching Dhammakaya meditation together with Maechi Chandra. In the beginning, the meditation courses were conducted in a small house called 'Ban Thammaprasit' in the Wat Paknam Bhasicharoen compound. Because of the popularity of both teachers, the house soon became overcrowded with interested students and they considered it more appropriate to start a new center by themselves. Although initially they intended to buy a plot of land in Patum Thani, the landowner Khunying Prayat Suntharawet gave a plot four times the requested size to celebrate her birthday. Thus, on 20 February 1970, Maechi Chandra, Phra Dhammajayo, Phra Dattajivo and their students moved to the 196 rai (313,600 m^{2}) plot of land to found a meditation center. A book about the initiative was compiled, to inspire people to join in and help with the building of the meditation center. The site eventually became an official temple in 1977 and was later named Wat Phra Dhammakaya.

=== Life as abbot ===
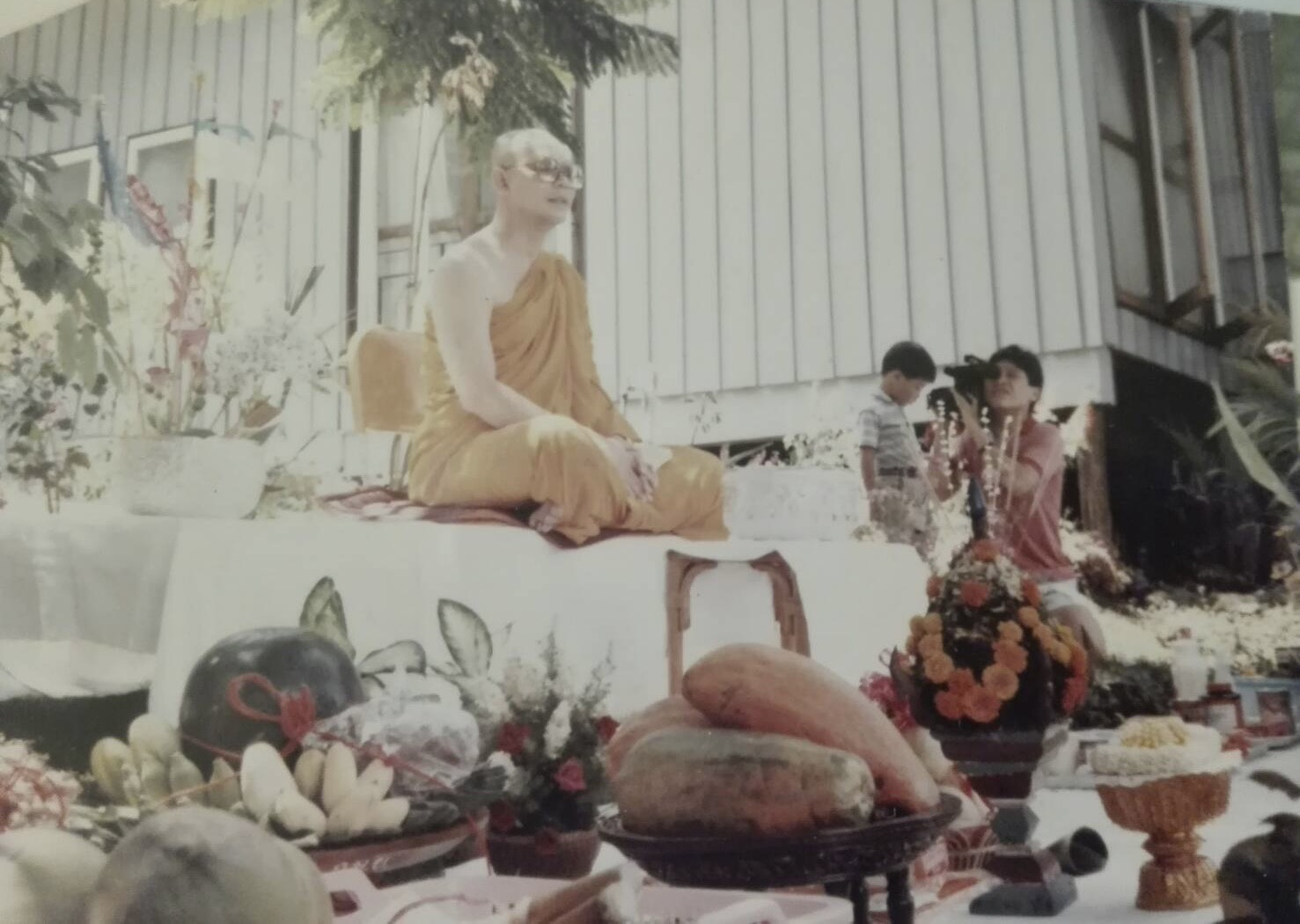
Luang Por Dhammajayo during a ceremony with offerings of food

Phra Dhammajayo later became abbot of the temple and was called Luang Por (meaning 'venerable father') Dhammajayo from then on. In the early years, Maechi Chandra still had an important role in fundraising and decision-making. However, in the years that followed, this would gradually become less, as she grew older and withdrew more to the background of the temple's organization. From then onward, Luang Por Dhammajayo received a greater role. The temple gained great popularity during the 1980s (during the Asian economic boom), attracting up to fifty thousand people on major ceremonies.

In the wake of the 1997 Asian Financial Crisis, Wat Phra Dhammakaya and Luang Por Dhammajayo came under widespread criticism and an investigation from the Sangha Supreme Council. The main criticism was that the temple was using fundraising methods that did not fit in with Buddhism. One of the accusations investigated was that Luang Por Dhammajayo had moved land donated to the temple to his own name. The temple denied this, stating that it was the intention of the donors to give the land to the abbot and not the temple. During this time, a letter with the then Supreme Patriarch's signature was leaked to the press implying that Luang Por Dhammajayo had to disrobe for not returning the land. (Note: The consensus was that this was written as a conditional order if (and only if) he did not return the land, which was eventually done.) However, the authenticity of the letter was put into question. (Note: Journalists and scholars pointed out some anomalies with the letter, including its layout and the timing of its release. A leading journalist on religious affairs later stated that the Supreme Patriarch would never leak such a letter directly to the press. The then Supreme Patriarch was also seriously ill at the time and could not easily be reached.) Eventually the Sangha Council declared that Luang Por Dhammajayo had not broken any serious offenses against monastic discipline (Vinaya). Despite this, the Religious Affairs Department charged Luang Por Dhammajayo with embezzlement and removed him from his post as abbot.

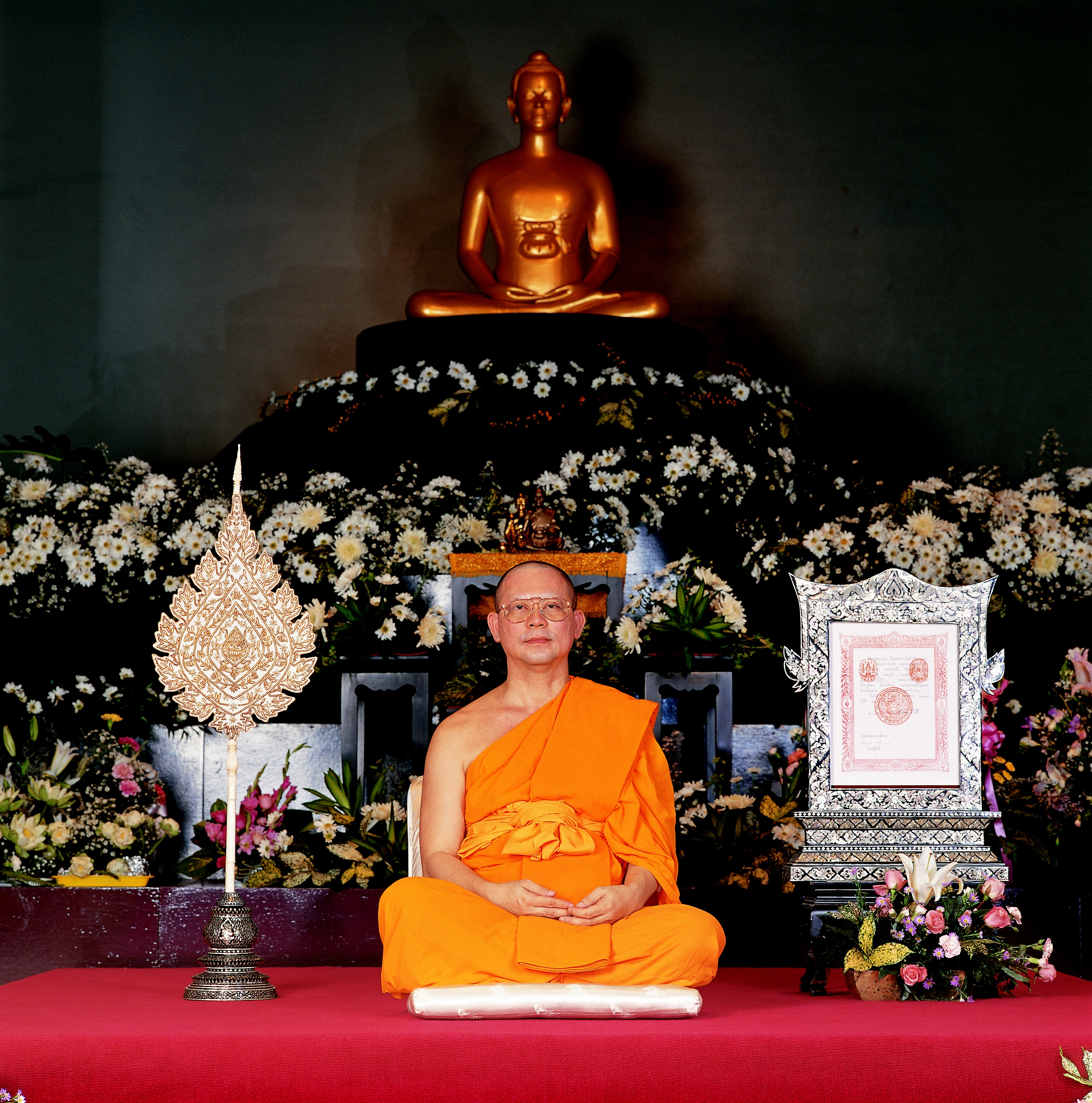
Luang Por Dhammajayo sitting in the Ubosot at Wat Phra Dhammakaya.

During this period, many Thai news reporters used pejorative language in describing Luang Por Dhammajayo, as well as members of the Sangha Supreme Council. Monastic chiefs nationwide sent letters to the Prime Minister over concerns about the media's language toward the Sangha. Widespread negative media coverage at this time was symptomatic of the temple being made the scapegoat for commercial malpractice in the Thai Buddhist temple community. In 1999, Wat Phra Dhammakaya filed several successful slander suits against various news outlets. In an interview held in the same year, LP Dhammajayo stated he understood the government's anxiety about Buddhist movements with large gatherings, but still felt perplexed about the controversies.

In the 2000s, Luang Por Dhammajayo began a nationwide anti-smoking and drinking campaign. This project led the World Health Organization (WHO) to present him with a World No Tobacco Day Award in 2004. In 2005, over one hundred religious organizations joined the campaign and successfully stopped the listing of liquor company Thai Beverage on the Stock Exchange of Thailand, which would have been the biggest listing in Thai history.

In 2006, the running lawsuits against Luang Por Dhammajayo were withdrawn by the Attorney-General, citing that Luang Por Dhammajayo had moved all of the disputed land to the name of the temple and that continuing the case would not benefit the public. His position as abbot was subsequently restored. Five years later, Luang Por Dhammajayo stepped down as abbot of Wat Phra Dhammakaya, with Luang Por Dattajivo taking over as caretaker abbot, although this was not widely known at the time.

==== Since the 2014 coup d'état ====
New investigations against Luang Por Dhammajayo appeared following the 2014 Thai coup d'état. The military junta created a National Reform Council with a religious committee led by former senator Paiboon Nititawan, Phra Suwit Dhiradhammo (known under the activist name Phra Buddha Issara), and former Wat Phra Dhammakaya monk Mano Laohavanich. In February 2015, Paiboon Nititawan led an unsuccessful bid to reopen the alleged land embezzlement case against Luang Por Dhammajayo from 1999. Meanwhile, Phra Suwit requested the Department of Special Investigation (DSI) to start an investigation into the assets of the Sangha Council's members. This included Somdet Chuang Varapuñño, who was Luang Por Dhammajayo's preceptor (the person who ordained him).

In 2015, Luang Por Dhammajayo was implicated in the Klongchan Credit Union controversy when 11.37 billion baht was taken out of the Klongchan Credit Union Cooperative (KCUC) via unauthorized checks, in which a portion totaling more than a billion baht was found to have been given to Wat Phra Dhammakaya via donations. In defense, spokespeople of Wat Phra Dhammakaya explained that Luang Por Dhammajayo was not aware that the donations were illegally obtained. In a written agreement with the credit union, supporters of the temple had raised the money linked to Wat Phra Dhammakaya to donate to the KCUC to compensate their members.

Regardless, Luang Por Dhammajayo was summoned to acknowledge the charges of ill-gotten gains and conspiring to money-laundering at the offices of the DSI. The temple requested the DSI to let him acknowledge his charges at the temple due to his deep vein thrombosis, a request the DSI refused. When Luang Por Dhammajayo failed to appear at the DSI office to acknowledge his charges, authorities launched several failed raids of the temple to find him. The standoff led to a 23-day lockdown of the temple in 2017 by the junta using Article 44 of the interim constitution, although authorities were still unable to find him. Many reporters questioned the practicality of using Article 44 and so many resources to arrest one person to acknowledge a charge of a non-violent crime, and pointed out the viability of trying him in absentia to determine guilt first.

News analysts have speculated that the actions of the Thai junta towards the temple may have reflected a political need to control who should be selected as the next Supreme Patriarch of Thailand. The monk who was next in line for the position, Somdet Chuang Varapuñño, had ordained Luang Por Dhammajayo. (Note: Prior to the change in law in December 2016, the Supreme Patriarch was chosen from whoever was the most senior member of the Sangha Supreme Council, who, at the time, was Somdet Chuang.) Selecting Somdet Chuang would have meant a Supreme Patriarch from the Maha Nikaya fraternity, rather than the Dhammayuttika fraternity, which historically had been the preferred choice by the Thai government and the monarchy. In fact, Somdet Chuang's appointment was withdrawn by the Thai Junta, with another candidate from the Dhammayuttika fraternity appointed instead. The coinciding lawsuits against Luang Por Dhammajayo, and Somdet Chuang's connection to him were, in fact, eventually used as a reason by the junta to withdraw his nomination.

In the aftermath of the lockdown additional charges were filed, this time also against the deputy abbot, Luang Por Dattajivo. With both Wat Phra Dhammakaya's honorary and deputy abbot under investigation, the junta pushed unsuccessfully to appoint an "outsider" abbot to run the temple. The junta stated it was necessary to take over the temple because it is a "threat to national security".

In December 2016, Luang Por Dhammajayo was given the position of honorary abbot by the Ecclesiastical Provincial Chief (governing monk of the region) of Pathum Thani. In December 2017, the temple assigned Phrakhru Sangharak Rangsarit as the temple's new abbot and began announcing the organization of new events. News outlet Kom Chad Luek described this as a "revival" of the temple, but news outlet Thai PBS stated that the temple had not been affected much by the disappearance of the former abbot. In 2016, Wat Phra Dhammakaya was described as the largest temple of Thailand.

== Teachings ==
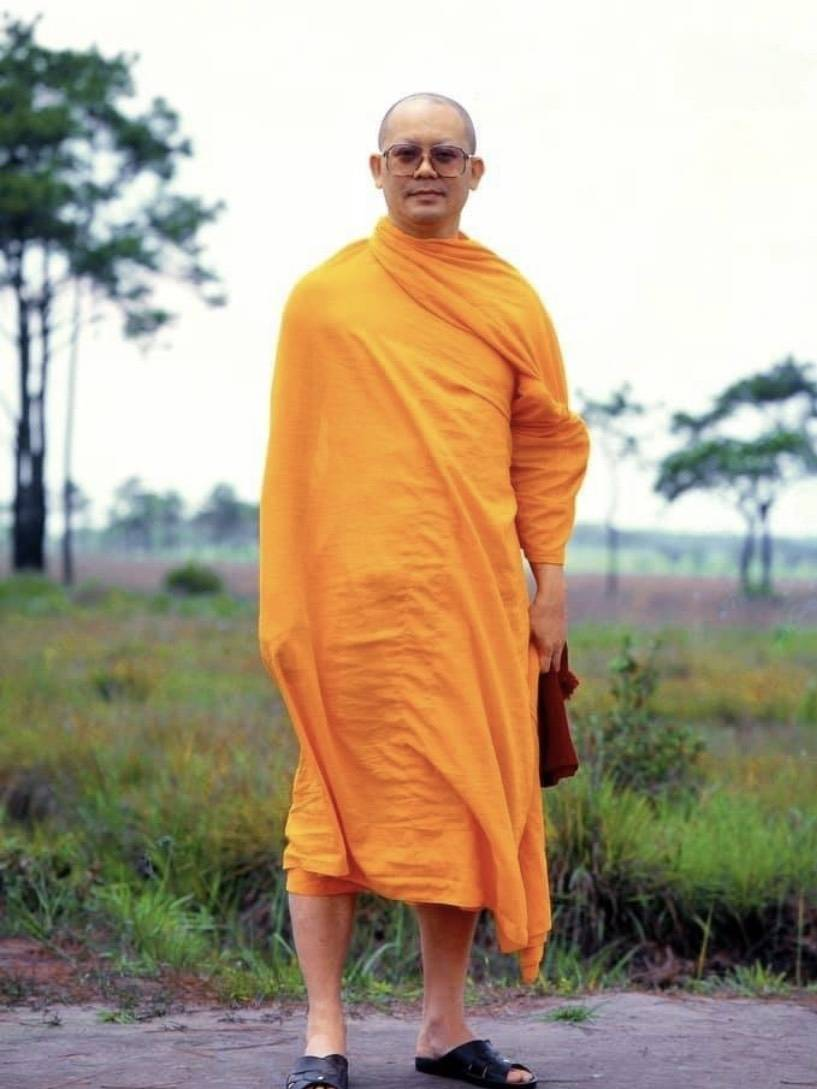
Luang Por Dhammajayo

Luang Por Dhammajayo's approach to Buddhism seeks to combine the ascetic and meditative life with modern personal ethics and social prosperity. Luang Por Dhammajayo is mostly known for his teachings with regard to Dhammakaya meditation. In his approach to propagating Buddhism he has emphasized a return to a purer Buddhism, as it had been in the past. He has also opposed protective magic and prognostication and refers to these as signs that Buddhism is deteriorating. Many followers in the temple believe that his projects are a product of his visions in meditation.

Luang Por Dhammajayo is known for his modern style of temple management and iconography. Luang Por Dhammajayo often uses positive terms to describe Nirvana. Apart from the true self as taught by the Dhammakaya tradition as a whole, religious studies scholar Rachelle Scott notes that Wat Phra Dhammakaya often describes Nirvana as being the supreme happiness, and argues that this may explain why the practice of Dhammakaya meditation is so popular. In its teachings on how meditation can help improve health and the quality of modern life, the temple has been compared to the Vipassana movement of S. N. Goenka. The temple's emphasis on meditation is expressed in several ways. Meditation books and CDs are for sale in stores around the temple, and every gathering that is organized by the temple will feature some time for meditation. The temple emphasizes the usefulness of meditating in a group, and sociologist Apinya Fuengfusakul notes that public meditations have a powerful effect on the minds of the practitioners.

Luang Por Dhammajayo was heavily influenced by Maechi Chandra Khonnokyoong in her teachings. He turned the Dhammakaya meditation method "into an entire guide of living" (McDaniel), emphasizing cleanliness, orderliness, and quiet, as a morality by itself and as a support for meditation. In short, Wat Phra Dhammakaya's appearance is orderly, and can be described as "a contemporary aesthetic" (Scott), which appeals to practitioners, especially the modern Bangkok middle class. Practitioners are also encouraged to keep things tidy and clean, through organized cleaning activities. A strong work ethic is promoted through these activities, in which the most menial work is seen as the most valuable and fruitful.

Wat Phra Dhammakaya has a vision of a future ideal society. Wat Phra Dhammakaya is known for its emphasis on meditation, especially samatha meditation (meditation aiming at tranquility of mind). Through Luang Por Dhammajayo's teachings, Wat Phra Dhammakaya started to develop a more international approach to its teachings, teaching meditation in non-Buddhist countries as a religiously neutral technique suitable for those of all faiths, or none. The temple emphasizes that the daily application of Buddhism will lead the practitioner and society to prosperity and happiness in this life and the next, and the temple expects a high commitment to that effect. Through meditation, fundraising activities and volunteer work, the temple emphasizes the making of merit, and explains how through the law of kamma merit yields its fruits, in this world and the next. The ideal of giving as a form of building character is expressed in the temple's culture with the words Cittam me, meaning 'I am victorious', referring to the overcoming of inner defilements (Pali: kilesa).

== Recognition ==
In 1994, LP Dhammajayo received an honorary degree from the Mahachulalongkornrajavidyalaya University. In 2013, in commemoration of the year 2550 of the Buddhist Era, the World Buddhist Sangha Youth (WBSY) presented the Universal Peace Award to LP Dhammajayo at the third WBSY meeting in recognition of his work in disseminating Buddhism for more than thirty years. Other awards that have been given to LP Dhammajayo are the Phuttha-khunupakan award from the House of Representatives in 2009, and a World Buddhist Leader Award from the National Office of Buddhism (2014).

Luang Por Dhammajayo was given the monastic title of Phrasudharmayanathera in 1991, followed by Phrarajbhavanavisudh in 1996. In 2011, he received his third and last title Phrathepyanmahamuni. In March 2017, King Rama X approved a request by junta leader Prayuth Chan-ocha to remove Luang Por Dhammajayo's title for not acknowledging the charges laid upon him.

== Publications ==
- Luang Por Dhammajayo (2007) Pearls of Inner Wisdom: Reflections on Buddhism, Peace, Life and Meditation (Singapore: Tawandhamma Foundation) ISBN 978-981-05-8521-1
- Luang Por Dhammajayo (2007) Tomorrow the World Will Change: A Practice for all Humanity (Singapore: Tawandhamma Foundation) ISBN 978-981-05-7757-5
- Luang Por Dhammajayo (2008) Journey to Joy: The Simple Path Towards a Happy Life (Singapore: Tawandhamma Foundation) ISBN 978-981-05-9637-8
- Luang Por Dhammajayo (2008) Lovely Love (Singapore: Tawandhamma Foundation) ISBN 978-981-08-0044-4
- Monica Oien (2009) Buddha Knows: An Interview With Abbot Dhammajayo On Buddhism (Patumthani: Tawandhamma Foundation), based on interviews held for the Norwegian TV series Gudene vet
- Luang Por Dhammajayo (2011) At Last You Win (Patumthani: Dhammakaya Foundation) ISBN 978-616-7200-15-6
- Luang Por Dhammajayo (2014) Beyond Wisdom (Patumthani: Dhammakaya Foundation) ISBN 978-616-7200-53-8
