= People Reform Party =

Thai political party

People Reform Party พรรคประชาชนปฏิรูป
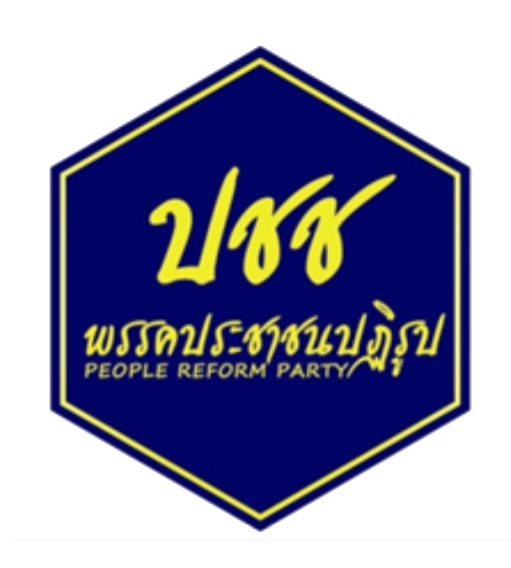
- Leader: Paiboon Nititawan
- Secretary-General: Mano Laohavanich
- Founded: 2 March 2018
- Dissolved: 3 September 2019
- Merged into: Palang Pracharath Party
- Headquarters: Bangkok, Thailand
- Ideology: Conservatism; Reformism; Pro-military; Buddhist nationalism
- Political position: Centre-right
- Colours: Blue

People Reform Party (Thai: พรรคประชาชนปฏิรูป) was a political party in Thailand. The party was established and registered at the Election Commission on 2 March 2018 by Paiboon Nititawan.

In the 2019 general election, the party's stance was to support military junta head General Prayut Chan-o-cha to remain as prime minister. The party had the reform of the Buddhist clergy in Thailand as a central part of its platform, advocating for significant state control of Buddhism. Reforms party leaders Paiboon Nititawan and Mano Laohavanich had proposed included requiring temples to open their finances to the public, ending the practice of short-term ordinations that are iconic in Thai Buddhism, requiring monks to carry smart cards to identify their legal and religious backgrounds, increased government control of temples bank accounts, increased government control of monastic disciplinarians, mandating the changing the abbots of all temples every five years, putting the Ministry of Culture in charge of controlling all temple assets, state controlled monastic education, and getting rid of the tax exempt status of Buddhist monks.

During the campaign, the party was investigated for using Buddhism for political advertisement but was cleared by the Thai Election Commission. According to preliminary results, party originally won no seats in Parliament with only 40,000 votes, but after the Thai Election Commission altered the formula in how seats were awarded after the election results were announced, the party gained one seat, with Paiboon becoming the only MP, and allowing the junta-backed Palang Pracharat party to form a coalition government and control the lower house of Parliament.

On 22 August 2019, Paiboon revealed that the party executive committee had unanimously voted to dissolve the party, as the party only had a single MP and most party executive directors did not have time to organize its branches.

On 26 August 2019, the Election Commission of Thailand approved the dissolution of the party, which was officially published in the Royal Thai Government Gazette on 6 September 2019. Paiboon announced that he had applied to become a member of Palang Pracharath Party on 9 September.
