= Dhammakaya tradition =

Tradition in Thai Buddhism

Dhammakaya Tradition
- Type: Buddhist Tradition
- School: Theravada, Maha Nikaya
- Founded: c. 1916; Thailand
- Founder: Luang Pu Sodh Candasaro
- Teachings: Dhammakaya Meditation
- Notable Temples: Wat Paknam Bhasicharoen; Wat Phra Dhammakaya; Wat Luang Phor Sodh Dhammakayaram
- Notable People: Luang Por Dhammajayo; Luang Por Dattajivo; Luang Por Sermchai Jayamangalo Chandra Khonnokyoong

The Dhammakaya tradition or Dhammakaya movement (sometimes spelled Thammakaai) is a Thai Buddhist tradition founded by Luang Pu Sodh Candasaro in the early 20th century. It is associated with several temples descended from Wat Paknam Bhasicharoen in Bangkok.

The tradition is distinguished from other Thai Buddhist traditions by its teachings on the Buddhist concept of Dhammakaya and the practice of Dhammakaya meditation (Vijja Dhammakaya), a method which scholars have connected to the Yogavacara tradition, which predates the 19th-century reform of Thai Buddhism. The Dhammakaya tradition is known for its teaching that there is a "true self" connected with Nirvana, which was notably criticized in the 1990s as an alleged contradiction of the Buddhist doctrine of anattā (non-self).

The Dhammakaya tradition is seen by its followers as a form of Buddhist revivalism pioneered by Luang Pu Sodh Candasaro. Buddhist Studies scholars have described aspects of its practices as having characteristics of religious apologetics, and Buddhist modernism. Features of the tradition include teaching meditation in a group, teaching meditation simultaneously to monastics and lay people, and an emphasis on lifelong ordination.

== Nomenclature ==
Dhammakaya Tradition refers to a modern Buddhist tradition that has emerged in Thailand, but is based on older Yogavacara, c.q. Esoteric Theravada teachings, which have survived the 19th and 20th century modernisation of Thai Buddhism. Dhammakaya means 'Dhamma body', referring to an "inner Buddha nature," which its practitioners aim to realize through meditation.

According to the anthropologist and Asian studies scholar Edwin Zehner, the term Dhammakaya (also spelled Thammakai) has four contextual meanings, though all four are "written and pronounced exactly alike":

- In the first sense, it refers to the doctrinal concept of "dharma-body" as found in Pali and Sanskrit texts.
- Second, it means the "inner dharma-body" that is a goal of the Dhammakaya meditation practitioner.
- Third, it refers to all the meditation centers and teachers who preach a Dhammakaya meditation style in Thailand.
- Fourth, it refers to Wat Phra Dhammakaya and its associated institutions – the largest temple in the Dhammakaya Tradition.

The term Dhammakaya, states Zehner, has close affinities to the Mahayana Buddhism concept of Dharmakaya (spiritual essence of the Buddha), and the word appears in many early Pali and Sanskrit texts, where its early meaning was "the collection of the dhamma". However, the Dhammakaya Tradition's conception of the "Dhammakaya" doctrine is different from the definition found in the Pali-English dictionary of the Pali Text Society, states Zehner.

Scholars are not in agreement on the name of the Dhammakaya tradition. Some scholars use Dhammakaya Tradition, while others use the term Dhammakaya temples, or Dhammakaya Movement. Newell states the term Dhammakaya Movement has been confusingly used by various scholars. Some scholars use the term Dhammakaya movement interchangeably with Wat Phra Dhammakaya – the tradition's largest temple. She considers this problematic because this terminology has been used "without distinguishing between the various temples practising dhammakaya meditation and Wat Dhammakaya [sic] itself ... There are considerable differences in style, practice and structure of all the temples". She prefers to use the term Dhammakaya temples.

She is quoted on this by Religious Studies scholar Justin McDaniel, but he nevertheless uses Dhammakaya Movement without distinguishing between the various temples and Wat Phra Dhammakaya. Buddhist Studies scholars Kate Crosby and Phibul Choompolpaisal, on the other hand, speak of a "network" of Dhammakaya temples.

== History ==
=== Yogavacara origins ===
Scholars have theorized that the Dhammakaya Tradition has its roots in the Yogavacara tradition (also known as Southern Esoteric Buddhism; not to be confused with the Yogacara School in Mahayana Buddhism), which thrived in pre-modern, pre-colonial times. This ancestry would be related to Wat Ratchasittharam, the former residence of Somdet Suk Kaithuen (early 19th century), "the heir to the teaching of Ayutthaya meditation masters," (Note: Named after Thai monks from the Ayutthaya Kingdom. Their influence stretched as far as Sri Lanka, were a revival of Buddhist meditation took place in the 1750s.) and the temple where Luang Pu Sodh used to practice before he went on to develop Dhammakaya meditation.

According to theologian Rory Mackenzie, Yogavacara ideas are the most likely influence on Dhammakaya meditation system, though this is not definitely proven. According to Buddhist Studies scholar Catherine Newell, "there is no doubt that Dhammakaya meditation is based upon the broader yogavacara tradition." She presents evidence of the borrowing of Luang Pu Sodh's Dhammakaya system from Somdet Suk's system of meditation. She and Asian studies scholar Phibul Choompolpaisal believe a Yogavacara origin to be most likely. If this would be the case, the tradition's meditation method would be an exoteric (openly taught) version of what initially was an esoteric tradition.

An alternative theory suggests an origin in Tibetan or other forms of Mahayana Buddhism. According to Mackenzie, it is possible but unlikely that someone who knew the Tibetan meditation methods met and shared that knowledge with Luang Pu Sodh in the early 1910s. There are similarities between the two systems, states Mackenzie, as well as with the concepts such as chakra (tantric psycho-physical centers), "crystal sphere" and Vajra. Though these commonalities are widely accepted, no proof has emerged yet of the cross-fertilization of Tibetan Buddhist practices into Dhammakaya system. Yogavacara ideas are the most likely influence on Dhammakaya meditation system, but this too has yet to be proven, states Mackenzie. Newell acknowledges that Crosby doubts the link because of the two systems using different terminology.

It is alternatively possible that Luang Pu Sodh developed his approach based on his own psychic experiences.

=== Luang Pu Sodh Candasaro ===
The tradition was started by Luang Pu Sodh Candasaro in the early twentieth century. In 1916, after three hours of meditating on the mantra sammā araham, (Note: According to Mackenzie, the mantra means "righteous Absolute of Attainment which a human being can achieve". Scott states it refers to "a fully enlightened person", a phrase traditionally referring to the Buddha. It is found in the common Theravada tradition chant of, "Namo Tassa Bhagavato Arahato Samma Sambuddhassa".) a Dhammakaya Foundation publication states "his mind [suddenly] became still and firmly established at the very centre of his body," and he experienced "a bright and shining sphere of Dhamma at the centre of his body, followed by new spheres, each "brighter and clearer." According to Luang Pu Sodh, this was the true Dhamma-body, or Dhammakaya, the "spiritual essence of the Buddha and nibbana [which] exists as a literal reality within the human body," and the true Self (as opposed to the non-self). (Note: In some respects its teachings resemble the Buddha-nature doctrines of Mahayana Buddhism. Paul Williams has commented that this view of Buddhism is similar to ideas found in the shentong teachings of the Jonang school of Tibet made famous by Dolpopa Sherab Gyaltsen.) According to Mackenzie, "Luang Phaw Sot sought to relate his breakthrough to the Satipatthana Sutta. He interpreted a phrase which is normally understood as 'contemplating the body as a body' as contemplating the body in the body." According to Luang Pu Sodh, meditation could reveal "a series of astral and spiritual bodies of progressive fineness" within the physical body of a person.

Convinced that he had attained the core of the Buddha's teaching, Phra Candasaro devoted the rest of his life to teaching, and furthering the depth of knowledge of Dhammakaya meditation, a meditation method which he also called "Vijja Dhammakaya", 'the direct knowledge of the Dhammakaya'. Temples in the tradition of Wat Paknam Bhasicharoen, together called the Dhammakaya tradition, believe that this method was the method the Buddha originally used to attain Enlightenment, but was lost five hundred years after the Buddha passed away. The rediscovery of Dhammakaya technique is usually described by the Dhammakaya tradition in miraculous terms with cosmic elements. For example, it is mentioned that heavy rains purified the temple before the rediscovery.

=== The first generation of students ===
After discovering the Dhammakaya meditation approach, Luang Pu Sodh first taught it to others at Wat Bangpla, Bang Len District, Nakhon Pathom. Since Luang Pu Sodh was given his first position as abbot at Wat Paknam, Dhammakaya meditation has been associated with this temple. Other temples, such as Wat Luang Phor Sodh Dhammakayaram, also have their roots in Wat Paknam. It survived despite pressures in the nineteenth and early twentieth century to reform. (Note: During the revival and modernization of Thai Buddhism in the nineteenth and early twentieth century CE, Thai temples in the Mahanikaya fraternity were forced to adjust to new reforms, including the meditation method used and taught. In particular, leading monks in the Mahanikaya fraternity promoted the New Burmese method of U Narada and Mahasi Sayadaw. Yet, Mackenzie notes: "Crosby (2000:178–9) mentions three theories as to the possible development of the Yogavacara tradition in Thailand. First, it may have been the case that the Yogavacara tradition came to Thailand through the Mon (Southern Burmese) expression of Buddhism ... As a young monk, Prince Mongkut believed the Mon tradition to be the one most in keeping with the original teachings of the Buddha and he was re-ordained by Mon monks. It would thus be ironic if this tradition was the carrier of ideas that the Thammayut fraternity sought to discredit in their bid to standardise Thai Buddhism!)

Dhammakaya meditation has been taught by Luang Pu Sodh's students at Wat Paknam Bhasicharoen, Wat Phra Dhammakaya, Wat Luang Por Sodh Dhammakayaram, and at Wat Rajorasarama, as well as at the respective branches of these temples. Apart from these major temples, there are also several other centers that practice in the tradition of Luang Pu Sodh.

==== Maechi Thongsuk Samdaengpan ====
Maechi Thongsuk (1900–1963) was a nun well-known for her meditation teaching. She was born on 1 August 1900 at Baan Saphan Lueang, Bangrak District, Bangkok. She was the third born to her father Rom and mother Wan. She was separated from her parents at an early age, being adopted by her uncle and aunt instead. She had no formal education and was illiterate. She married a surgeon at Chulalongkorn Hospital. They had two children together before the untimely death of her husband, after which she had to support herself and her children by working as a salesperson.

In 1930, Thongsuk Samdaengpan started to study meditation at Wat Paknam Bhasicharoen under the instruction of Luang Pu Sodh. As a laywoman, and later as a maechi, she taught high-profile supporters of Wat Paknam Bhasicharoen, such as Liap Sikanchananand. It was at Liap's house that Maechi Thongsuk met Chandra Khonnokyoong, who she taught Dhammakaya meditation. After the two stayed for a month at Wat Paknam, they both ordained as maechis. Maechi Thongsuk travelled around Thailand to spread the Dhamma and teach Dhammakaya Meditation according to the policy of Luang Pu Sodh. Maechi Thongsuk was diagnosed with cervical cancer in 1960, and died of it on 3 February 1963 at Wat Paknam Bhasicharoen. She was aged sixty-three, having been a maechi for twenty-five years.

==== Maechi Chandra Khonnokyoong ====
Maechi Chandra (1909–2000) became strongly interested in meditation when she was still a child, after she was cursed by her drunken father. After he died, she wished to reconcile with him through contacting him in the afterlife. In 1935, she went to Bangkok to work and find a way to meet Luang Pu Sodh. After she met Maechi Thongsuk and learnt meditation from her, she ordained at Wat Paknam. She later became a prominent meditation student of Luang Pu Sodh. After Luang Pu Sodh's death, she became instrumental in introducing Dhammakaya meditation to Luang Por Dhammajayo and Luang Por Dattajivo, with whom she later founded Wat Phra Dhammakaya. Luang Por Dhammajayo and Luang Por Dattajivo, the current abbot and vice-abbot of Wat Phra Dhammakaya, were students of maechi (nun) Chandra Khonnokyoong.

== Beliefs and practices ==
=== Dhammakaya meditation ===
Meditation is the most important practice of all major temples in the Dhammakaya tradition. The meditation system of the tradition distinguishes it from mainstream Theravada Buddhism. According to Suwanna Satha-Anand, the tradition believes that meditation and the attainment of the Dhammakaya is the only way to Nirvana. Additionally, this technique is claimed in its advanced stages to bring forth abhiñña, or mental powers, and allow the meditator to visit past lives and alternate planes of existence, wherein one can affect the present life's circumstances.

Essential in this process is the "center of the body", which Luang Pu Sodh precisely describes as being at a point two finger widths above the navel of each person: whatever technique someone might use to meditate, the mind can only attain a higher level of insight through this center. This center is also believed to play a fundamental role in the birth and death of an individual. The center of the body has also been described as the "end of the breath", the deepest point in the abdomen where the breath goes back and forth.

==== Samatha phase ====
There are several techniques which can be used by practitioners in focusing the attention on the center of the body.

Practitioners may visualize a mental image at the center of the body – characteristically, a crystal ball or a crystal clear Buddha image. This has been compared with meditation on a bright object in the Visuddhimagga. Practitioners then visualize this image in front of themselves, and then move the mental image inwards through seven bases of the mind until reaching the center. Once the mental hindrances are overcome, the visual image imagined is transformed.

Practitioners may also use a mantra (Thai: บริกรรมภาวนา, romanized: borikam-phavana), traditionally Sammā-Arahaṃ, which refers to the Buddha who has 'perfectly' (sammā) attained 'perfection in the Buddhist sense' (arahaṃ), as can be found in the traditional Tiratanavanda chant. This is a form of Buddhanussati, i.e. recollecting the Buddha qualities. This mantra has also been used by monks from Northern Thailand. Alternatively, practitioners can also place their attention at the center of the body directly, and can even do so without visualizing or using a mantra, according to Dhammakaya publications.

The first stage of this path Luang Pu Sodh simply called the 'beginning of the path' (Thai: ปฐมมรรค, romanized: pathommamak). After that, Luang Pu Sodh would usually describe the level of attainment in terms of inner bodies (Pali: kāya) within every human being, which are successively more subtle, and come in pairs. In total, every human being consists of nine types of bodies, each of which has a normal and refined form.

The first four pairs of these bodies are equated with the orthodox jhāna meditation attainments. Next is the 'change-of-lineage' (Pali: gotrabhū) intermediary Dhammakaya state: this is the intermediate state between not being enlightened yet, and the four stages of enlightenment. The final four of these inner pairs are called the Dhammakayas, and are equated with the four stages of enlightenment, leading to the final stage of enlightenment (arahant).

==== Vipassana ====
In Dhammakaya meditation, the vipassana (insight) stage is done after practitioners have attained the Dhammakaya and they can gain insight into the reality of life through observation of their own physical and mental processes. This is done by contemplating the three marks of existence of the lower mundane inner bodies. At this stage, is believed practitioners can understand birth, death and suffering at a deeper level, when they see the literal essence of these phenomena through meditative attainment. The higher knowledge and transcendental wisdom in the vipassana stage is "beyond the attainment of Dhammakaya" of the samatha stage in the Dhammakaya meditation tradition.

=== True Self ===
==== Nirvana as True Self ====
According to the Dhammakaya tradition, the Buddha made the discovery that nirvana is the true Self (Pali: attā). The tradition calls this true self the Dhammakāya, the spiritual essence. The tradition believes that this essence of the Buddha and Nirvana exist as a literal reality within each individual. The not-self teaching (Pali: anattā) is considered by the tradition a means to let go of what is not the self, to attain the true self. According to Buddhist studies scholar Paul Williams,

"[Dhammakaya] meditations involve the realization, when the mind reaches its purest state, of an unconditioned "Dhamma Body" (dhammakaya) in the form of a luminous, radiant and clear Buddha figure free of all defilements and situated within the body of the practitioner. Nirvana is the true Self, and this is also the dhammakaya."

==== Interpretation of True Self ====
Some of the beliefs and practices of the Dhammakaya tradition – such as those concerning nirvana, "true self", and meditation – have been criticised as allegedly opposing or rejecting mainstream Theravāda teachings and practices by traditional Thai Buddhist institutions and scholars. (Note: See Scott 2009, pp. 3, 82, 129–130, 140: "... critique of the Dhammakaya Temple's wealth and alleged heretical teachings and practices ..." (p. 3); "... high ranking monastic officials who alleged that Phra Dhammachayo had violated the monastic code of conduct by teaching heretical views on nirvana". (pp. 129–130); ff.; Scott (2008, pp. 231, 248); Taylor (2016, pp. 55–57) ; and Mackenzie 2007, pp. 16–7, 50–2, 175–9: "Thailand's highly regarded scholar monk, Phra Dhammapitaka [Prayudh Payutto] sought to identify Wat Phra Dhammakaya's position as heretical by commenting, 'In all Buddhist scriptures, both the Tipitaka and the commentaries, there is no evidence that nibbana is atta. But there is much evidence that nibbana is anatta ...'" (p. 51); "... his understanding of the Pali scriptures clearly demonstrates to the Thai that the movement is heretical in its beliefs" (p. 16)) The bulk of Thai Theravāda Buddhism rejects the true-self teaching of Dhammakaya, and insists upon absolute non-self as the Buddha’s real teaching. The controversy on the true nature of anattā dates as far back as 1939, when the 12th Supreme Patriarch of Thailand published a book arguing that nirvana was the "true self". This dispute arose again in the 1990s when the monastic scholar Phra Prayudh Payutto published a book criticising the Dhammakaya tradition’s teachings on nirvana. Phra Payutto states, in his book The Dhammakaya Case, that the "Nibbāna [Nirvana] is Higher Self (attā)” teaching of Dhammakaya "insults" Buddhist canonical and post-canonical teachings. He continues that historic Theravāda teachings emphasise nirvana in the context of anattā, and that "nirvana as attā" is not an acceptable interpretation. Phra Payutto has, however, been criticised in return by a number of Thai academics and journalists for being "dogmatist" and promoting religious intolerance. Although some scholars have criticized Dhammakaya's teachings on nirvana in the past, these critiques garnered virtually no public attention until the 1990s when Phra Payutto published his book. According to religion scholar Rachelle Scott, Phra Payutto's word was largely considered authoritative in Thai Theravada Buddhism, and thus legitimized Dhammakaya's interpretation of nirvana as controversial.

According to proponents and teachers of the tradition, such as the monk Luang Por Sermchai, it tends to be scholars who hold the view of absolute non-self, whereas "several distinguished forest hermit monks", such as Luang Pu Sodh, Ajahn Mun, and Ajahn Maha Bua, hold nirvana as true self, because they have "confirmed the existence of a Higher or Real Self (attā)” by their own realisations. He further states that Nirvana cannot be not-self because it is not a compounded and conditioned phenomenon. Religious studies scholar Potprecha Cholvijarn notes that Luang Pho Nong Indasuvaṇṇo, one of Luang Pu Sodh's early meditation teachers, takes a similar position. According to Luang Pho Nong, Nirvana as understood by Buddhist practitioners with direct experience differs from the understanding of Nirvana generally taken by scholars. Williams summarizes the views of Luang Por Sermchai and states that these ways of reading Buddhism in terms of "... a true Self certainly seem to have been congenial in the East Asian environment, and hence flourished in that context where for complex reasons Mahayana too found a ready home". According to Williams, the Dhammakaya-related debate in Thailand leads to an appreciation that

"... there are now and have been in history Buddhists who in good faith accept some sort of teaching of the Self and argue that a true Self was the ultimate purport of Buddhist teaching. Any scholarly account of Buddhist doctrine as it has existed in history in its totality has to accept diversity on the issue, even if it is true that the not-Self advocates appear to have been in the overwhelming majority".

According to James Taylor, a scholar of Religious Studies and Anthropology, Dhammakaya's doctrinal views on nirvana and "enduring notions of self" are similar to the Personalist School of early Buddhism. Paul Williams states that in some respects the teachings of the Dhammakaya tradition resemble the Buddha-nature and Trikaya doctrines of Mahāyāna Buddhism. He sees the Dhammakaya tradition as having developed independently of the Mahayana Tathagatagarbha tradition, but as achieving very similar results in its understanding of Buddhism. Potprecha Cholvijarn has compared and contrasted the Dhammakaya and Tathagatagarbha doctrines, as well as the meditative practices taught by Dhammakaya's Luang Pu Sodh and those in the Tibetan Shentong (gzhan stong) tradition.

The Dhammakaya tradition has responded in different ways to the debate of self and not-self. Apart from Luang Por Sermchai, Wat Phra Dhammakaya's assistant-abbot Luang phi Ṭhanavuddho wrote a book about the topic in response to critics. According to Rungrawee Chalermsripinyorat, the followers of the tradition seem not much interested in the discussion, and are more concerned how Dhammakaya meditation improves their mind. Besides its definition of nirvana as true happiness, permanent, and essential, nirvana is also described by the tradition from a more conventional Buddhist perspective, as the absence of greed, hatred, and delusion. Scott states that the positive description of nirvana as a state of supreme happiness may have contributed to the popularity of Wat Phra Dhammakaya among new members.

Supporters of the tradition also argue that Wat Phra Dhammakaya’s emphasis on meditation should not be understood as a neglect of scriptural learning. The temple has long maintained educational programmes in Pāli studies through its samnak phra pariyatti-dhamma, and has supported monastic education in Nak Tham studies, Abhidhamma, and Tipiṭaka studies. The temple has also established Buddhist educational and research institutions, including the DCI Center for Buddhist Studies, Dhammakaya Open University (DOU), and the Dhammachai International Research Institute (DIRI). These institutions are presented by the temple as part of its wider attempt to preserve and transmit Buddhism through pariyatti, or scriptural learning; paṭipatti, or practice; and paṭivedha, or realisation.

The tradition also rejects the characterisation of Dhammakaya meditation as merely samatha, or concentration meditation. According to its own understanding, concentration is the foundation for deeper insight, and advanced vipassanā requires the arising of the dhamma-cakkhu, or "Dhamma eye", through which reality is directly seen and known. For this reason, the tradition maintains that higher-level vipassanā practice requires the practitioner first to attain and become united with the Dhammakāya. This interpretation presents Dhammakaya meditation as a graded system in which calm, inner seeing, and insight are understood as successive and interrelated stages rather than as mutually exclusive practices.

Mackenzie argues that much of the criticism toward these beliefs comes from people who simply disapprove of Wat Phra Dhammakaya's high-profile status and fundraising practices. To support this, he notes that other Dhammakaya tradition temples such as Wat Paknam and Wat Luang Phor Sodh Dhammakayaram are hardly ever the subject of criticism the way Wat Phra Dhammakaya is, despite the temples sharing the same beliefs about Nirvana.

=== Magic and rituals ===
Major temples of the Dhammakaya tradition have expressed opposition to superstitious practices such as traditional "elaborate Buddhist ritual, protective magic, fortune telling, and the tools, images and money that went toward them". Dhammakaya publications, however, do extensively emphasize the miraculous and healing power of Buddhist amulets (Thai: phra khruang rang), and markets and distributes them.

Luang Pu Sodh, the founder of the Dhammakaya tradition, is believed by Thai people to have been a man of unusual powers. His biographies have included claims of supernatural powers, but also as someone who "showed respect for every method he learned", even "black magic", states Newell. He has been portrayed as opposing amulet collection as well as traditional magical rituals and fortune telling, although amulets were issued under his leadership and are generally prized in Thailand for their attributed powers. Luang Pu Sodh is known as a meditation master and healer to the Thai people, even those who are not Dhammakaya followers. According to McDaniel, his meditation practice is taught in Wat Phra Dhammakaya to "develop self-confidence", help in "family and business matters". At Dhammakaya retreats, some of this temple's adherents state that amulets, magic and ordination are arbitrary to the path of spiritual and financial security, according to McDaniel.

The tradition does claim miracles from its meditation practice. According to Newell, adherents believe Dhammakaya meditation can bring forth various abhiñña, or mental powers, at higher meditative attainments. According to Seeger, such claims and widespread use of miracles by the tradition has been one of the sources of controversy from the traditional Thai Buddhist establishment. Examples include stories of miraculous events such as Luang Pu Sodh performing "miraculous healings" at Wat Paknam, and meditation stopping the Allies from dropping an atom bomb on Bangkok due to the Japanese occupation of Thailand in World War II. According to Mackenzie, Wat Paknam was a popular bomb shelter for people in the surrounding areas in World War II due to stories of Luang Pu Sodh's abilities, and Thai news reports include multiple sightings of mae chi (nuns) from the temple levitating and intercepting bombs during the Allied bombings of Bangkok. Similarly, Wat Phra Dhammakaya has included claims of miracles in its advertisements along with images of "Mahsiriratthat amulets" with miraculous powers. These advertisements invite readers to visit the temple to witness such miraculous events. (Note: Scott mentions claims of "disappearing sun" from the sky and describes another example as follows: "Underneath these evocative photographs was printed the Webster's New World Dictionary's definition of a miracle: "An event or action that apparently contradicts known scientific laws and is hence thought to be due to supernatural causes." The advertisement continued, "Whether you believe in miracles or not, the experience of a great number of devotees at Wat Phra Dhammakaya in September this year certainly fits Webster's New World definition. There were two long testimonials describing the miracle on the bottom half of the page, while at the right-hand side there was an image of the now familiar Mahsiriratthat amulet and a description of its qualities and powers. Finally, at the bottom of the page, there were two testimonials from witnesses who described the miracle in their own words, imploring readers to visit the Temple in order to witness such miraculous events for themselves.") According to Newell, many Thais try accessing the alleged powers of Dhammakaya meditation indirectly through amulets. Amulets issued by Luang Pu Sodh eventually gained a reputation for being particularly powerful and are highly prized in Thailand for this reason.

=== Myths of cosmic struggle ===
According to information leaked to several scholars by Mano Laohavanich—who lived at Wat Phra Dhammakaya for two years—some in the Dhammakaya tradition believe in a mythical ongoing cosmic struggle between the "Black Dhammakāya" (Mara) and the "White Dhammakāya" with the idea that Luang Por Dhammajayo is a leader of this generation after Luang Pu Sodh Candasaro. Buddhist Studies scholar Peter Harvey states that group meditation is seen in part as a means to "help overcome the influence of evil Mara" against this world. Mackenzie states that meditating together to impact this struggle between the white party and black party is seen by these adherents to be both an individual and collective responsibility. This mythical struggle can be won by a critical mass of meditators, according to this belief, and this is considered to be a holy task.

Mackenzie states it is unclear how many of the tradition's followers believe this alleged myth. He quotes Choompolpaisal stating that this is not an insider's understanding, and also states that there is "no evidence" of such a meditation program at Dhammakaya tradition temples. Mackenzie continues that he has met adherents who appreciate the logic of the teachings and the focus on meditation, but that he has also met members who look to experience the miraculous and concludes that there may be many insider understandings. Documentary filmmaker Nottapon Boonprakob highlights reason for skepticism over whether this myth is taught at all. Boonprakob notes the idea that Luang Por Dhammajayo is believed to be a messiah is based solely on the testimony of Laohavanich, who claims to know this through secret "insider" knowledge from his time at Wat Phra Dhammakaya, and that by nature nobody can actually refute his allegation.

=== Influence ===
The Dhammakaya tradition has influenced several notable Buddhist traditions in Thailand. Cholvijarn notes three major figures in Thai Buddhism the tradition likely influenced.

The Manomayiddhi meditation tradition, states Cholvijarn, shares several similarities that were likely influenced by the Dhammakaya tradition. The meditation tradition's founder, Luang Pho Ruesi Lingdam, studied meditation under Luang Pu Sodh and several well known meditation masters in the 1930s. After learning Dhammakaya meditation at Wat Paknam, he incorporated it into his practice and eventually became a popular meditation teacher in Thailand. Cholvijarn notes that Luang Pho Ruesi's most popular technique, the Manomayiddhi method, has several similarities with Dhammakaya meditation. Luang Pho Ruesi has also admitted the tradition influenced his view of Nirvana, which he used to believe was void. However, after practicing Dhammakaya and other forms of meditation, he later changed his view to agree with the Dhammakaya tradition's.

The Songdhammakalyani Monastery, the first modern Thai monastery for bhikkhuni (fully ordained nuns), has its roots in the Dhammakaya tradition. The monastery's founder, Bhikkhuni Voramai Kabilsingh, first studied Buddhism at Wat Paknam. According to her autobiography, Bhikkhuni Voramai was suffering from uterine fibroid as a layperson and was told by a student of Luang Pu Sodh that the fibroid had been removed via meditation. When she went in for surgery, it was found that the fibroid was gone. The incident led her to the study of meditation at Wat Paknam as well as several other meditation schools and her eventual ordination. According to Cholvijarn, Bhikkhuni Voramai taught Dhammakaya meditation along with several other meditation methods until her death, as well as taught the concepts of dhammakaya and Nirvana similarly to the Dhammakaya tradition.

Phra Ariyakhunathan, a well known meditation master from the Thai Forest Tradition who was responsible for the first biography of lineage founder Ajahn Mun, may have also been influenced by the Dhammakaya tradition. Although Phra Ariyakhunathan does not acknowledge an influence, Cholvijarn notes that in 1950, Phra Ariyakhunathan, then a high ranking Dhammayuttika administrative monk, was sent to investigate the conduct of Luang Pu Sodh as his reputation in Thailand grew. After the meeting, Phra Ariyakhunathan returned with a positive report and then published a book describing the concept of dhammakaya in the same way as the Dhammakaya tradition. According to Cholvijarn, his understanding of dhammakaya likely came from discussions with meditation masters such as Luang Pu Sodh and Ajahn Mun, although Cholvijarn states that he also may have gotten these ideas from borān kammaṭṭhāna texts.

== Ecclesiastical characterisation and organisation ==
=== Characterisation ===
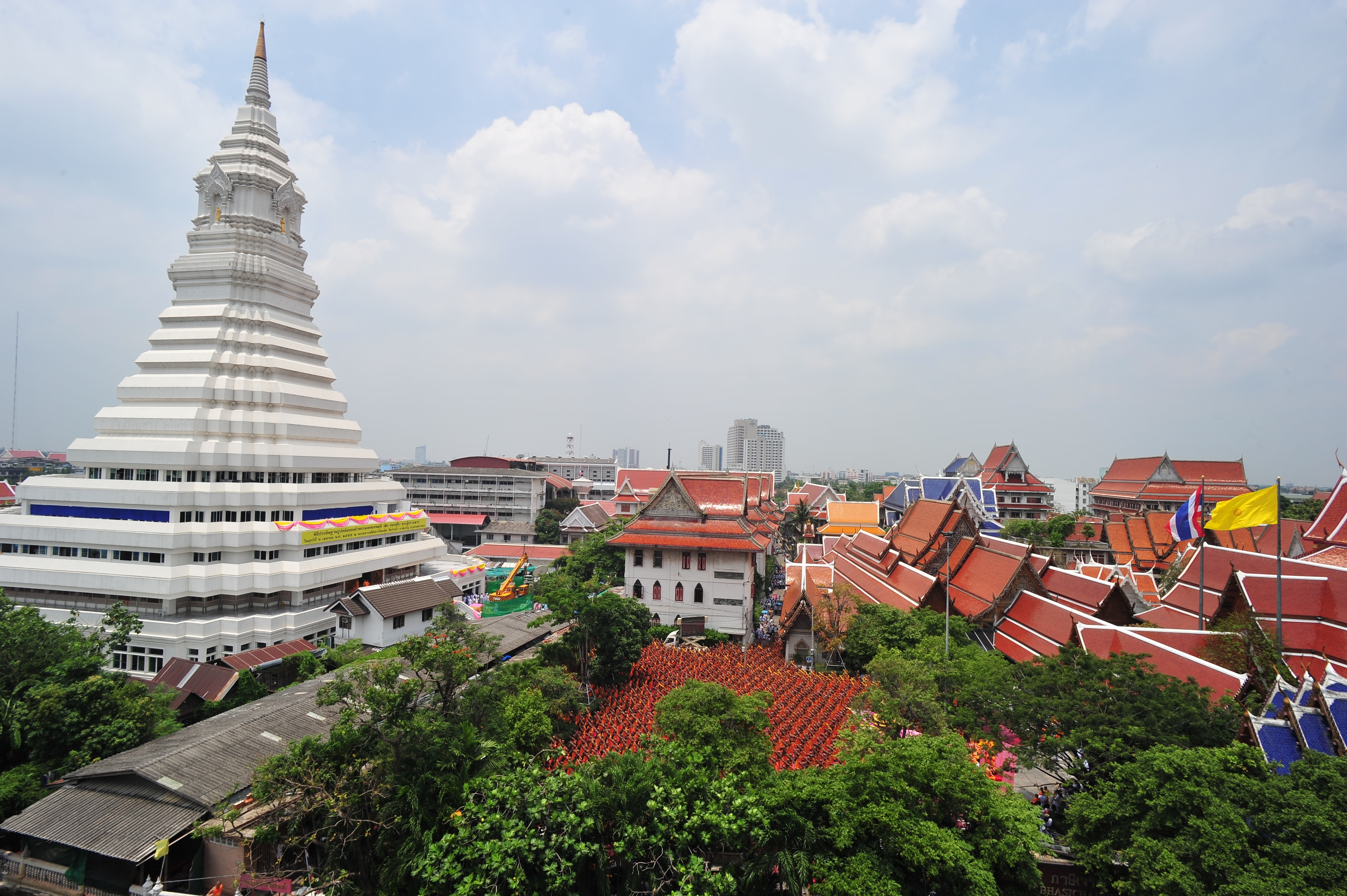
The stupa at Wat Paknam Bhasicharoen

The Dhammakaya tradition's practitioners state they find its teachings efficacious and transformative.

As part of a survey of fundamentalistic movements around the globe, Donald Swearer has termed the Dhammakaya tradition as "fundamentalistic" in orientation. By "fundamentalism" he is referring to the emerging tendencies in Theravada communities of Thailand and Sri Lanka where a "religiously grounded communal identity" is asserted along with an activist role of the laity. This tendency includes an apologetic, modernistic reinterpretation and reassertion of doctrines and practices, one that is combined with a "uniquely aggressive, critical, negative and absolutist" character.

Other scholars describe the Dhammakaya tradition as a revivalist movement. Whether the tradition is a new movement is a matter of debate; Wat Phra Dhammakaya, for one, has specifically said that they do not want to start a new monastic fraternity (nikaya). Central to the tradition is the Dhammakaya meditation practice, which the tradition considers the method through which the Buddha became enlightened, a method which was forgotten but has been revived by Luang Pu Sodh Candasaro. This method is called Vijja Dhammakaya.

Several scholars, states Martin Seeger, have described the disputes and relationship between the mainstream Thai Sangha and the Dhammakaya tradition as reflecting "intolerance and undermining freedom of religion". According to Seeger, the teachings and practices of the Dhammakaya tradition temples deviate from the Theravāda tradition, and the different interpretations of Buddhist canonical texts have triggered a heated debate in the Thai media and in the Sangha Council, a smear campaign and the purging of "religious others". Of these, Wat Phra Dhammakaya—the most influential in this regard—has been accused by Payutto of "distorting Buddhist ideas, insulting Buddha's teachings", and showing "disrespect to the Pali canon". Besides Payutto, other critics have included a number of "Thai scholars, academics, monks and social critics". Payutto has been criticized in return by a number of Thai academics and news commentators for being "narrow-minded", "attached to scriptures", "dogmatist" and a "purist". Also, Thai columnist Sopon Pornchokchai has accused Payutto of performing sloppy research. Taylor (2008) describes Thammakaai as religion characterised by spectacle, neoliberal, [trans-] modernism and commodified religiosity.

=== Methods of propagation ===
Luang Pu Sodh introduced Dhammakaya meditation, which is the core of the Dhammakaya tradition. Besides the technique of meditation itself, the methods through which Luang Pu Sodh taught have also been passed on to the main temples in the tradition. The tradition has an active style of propagation. Teaching meditation in a group, teaching meditation during ceremonies, teaching meditation simultaneously to monastics and lay people, and teaching one main meditation method to all are features which can be found throughout the tradition.

Newell relates that Luang Pu Sodh was the person who set up the maechi community at Wat Paknam, which is currently one of the largest maechi communities in Thailand. Although Luang Pu Sodh encouraged women to become maechis, maechis did have to spend quite some time doing domestic activities, more so than monks. This orientation echoes in Wat Phra Dhammakaya's approach to female spirituality, praising Maechi Chandra as an example of a meditation master, but at the same time not supporting the Bhikkhuni ordination movement.

Besides Wat Paknam's attitudes with regard to female spirituality, Wat Paknam's international orientation also became part of its heritage. The temple ordained several monks coming from the United Kingdom, and maintained relations with Japanese Buddhists. Currently, Wat Paknam has branch centers in the United States, Japan and New Zealand. This international orientation was also continued through the work of Wat Phra Dhammakaya, which, as of 2010, had thirty to fifty international centers, and through the work of Wat Luang Phor Sodh Dhammakayaram, which has two branch centers in Malaysia. Of all Thai Buddhist temples and traditions, the Dhammakaya tradition has an international presence that is one of the strongest. A characteristic that is also found both in Wat Paknam and other temples in Luang Pu Sodh's tradition, is its emphasis on lifelong ordination.

=== Amulets ===
The production and sale of protective amulets to finance the Dhammakaya tradition's early initiatives began with the founder of the tradition. The sale of amulets is "a common method of financing major temple building projects", states Newell. Wat Paknam, in Luang Pu Sodh's leadership, produced and sold amulets (Thai: phra khruang rang) that gained a reputation in Thailand for their alleged powers. According to Newell,

Sot [Luang Pu Sodh] was ... associated with some important issues of phra khrūang rāng [amulets], issued in order to finance some of the renovation and improvements, particularly the building of the Pali Institute which he undertook as part of his stewardship of Wat Paknam. There were also two issues of amulets to fund the Buddhamonthon Buddhist Park with which Sot was involved. These amulets have gained reputations as particularly powerful and effective, and change hands for considerable sums.

Luang Pu Sodh's amulets were—and are still—widely venerated for their attributed powers, and are traded at high prices. The Phutthamonthon park effort was started under Luang Pu Sodh's leadership in the 1950s and much of the construction work done in the 1970s, being financed by amulets issued by Wat Paknam. Wat Phra Dhammakaya, after its founding in the early 1970s, has continued to aggressively market amulets with alleged magical powers for fundraising purposes. It leverages the Buddhist merit-making tradition in Thailand.

== Notable temples ==
=== Wat Paknam Bhasicharoen ===
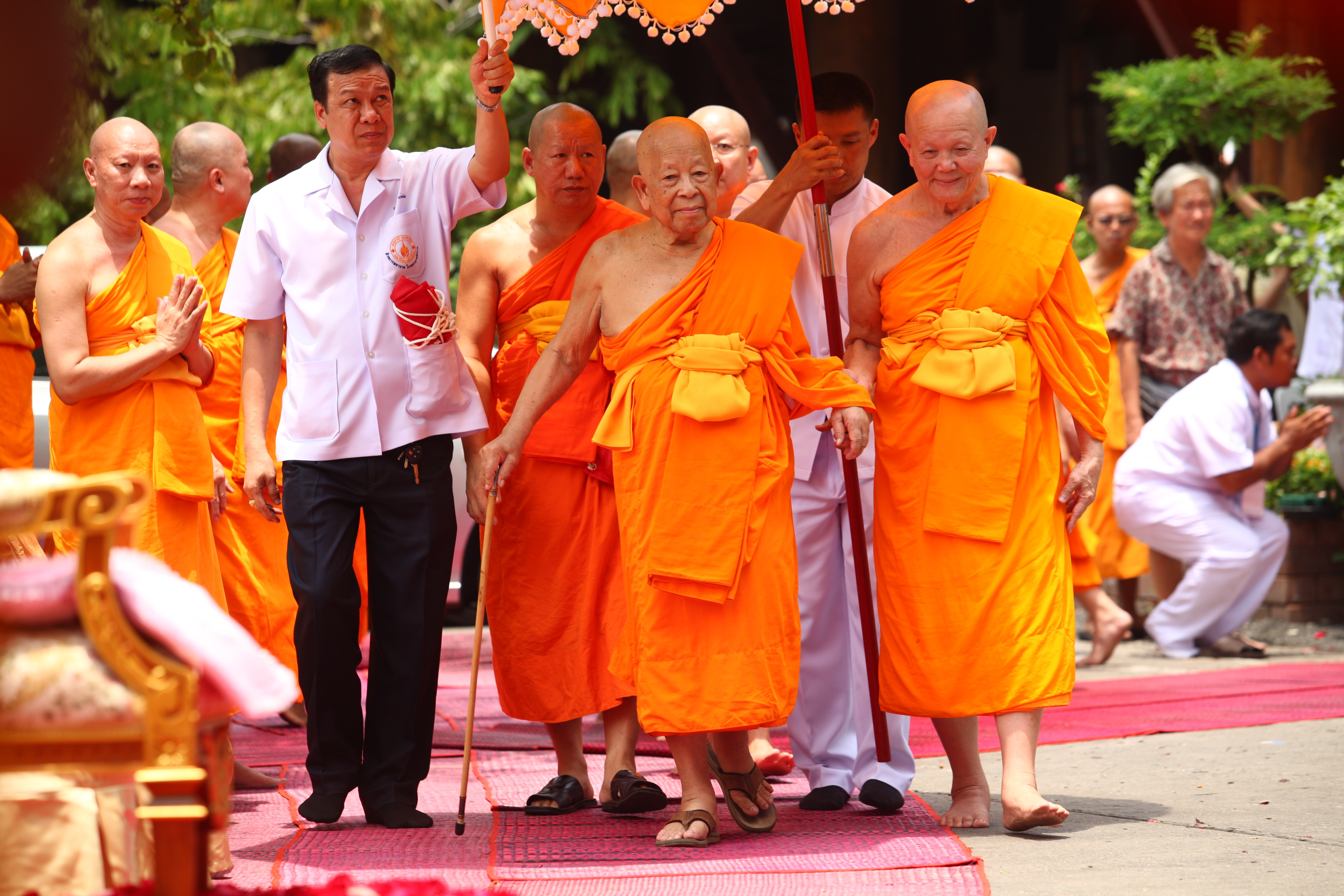
Somdet Chuang Varapuñño from Wat Paknam Bhasicharoen [left] and Luang Por Dattajivo from Wat Phra Dhammakaya [right]

Wat Paknam Bhasicharoen (Thai: วัดปากน้ำภาษีเจริญ) is a royal wat located in Phasi Charoen District, Bangkok, at the Chao Phraya River. Wat Paknam Bhasicharoen is the temple where Luang Pu Sodh Candasaro used to be the abbot, and still is known for its meditation lessons. The temple underwent a major change during the period that Luang Pu Sodh Candasaro became the temple's abbot, from a temple with only thirteen monks that was in disrepair, to a prosperous center of education and meditation practice. In 2008, it housed two hundred to four hundred monks, eighty to ninety samanera (young novices) and two hundred to three hundred maechis (nuns). As of 2008, the temple's abbot was Somdet Chuang Varapuñño, who was the acting Supreme Patriarch of Thailand (Sangharaja) from 2013 to 2017. In 2015, he was proposed by the Sangha Supreme Council as the new Supreme Patriarch, but the appointment was stalled by the junta, which cited objections by several influential former leaders of the 2014 coup d'état. The appointment was eventually withdrawn and a monk from the Dhammayuttika Nikaya appointed instead after the junta changed the law to allow the King to appoint the Supreme Patriarch directly, with the Prime Minister countersigning. In December 2021, Somdet Chuang died, aged 96.

=== Wat Phra Dhammakaya ===
Wat Phra Dhammakaya is located in Pathum Thani, north of Bangkok. It was founded by Maechi Chandra Khonnokyoong and Luang Por Dhammajayo. It is the temple that is most well-known in the Dhammakaya tradition because of its huge size and following, its numerous activities and also its controversies. The temple is popular among the Bangkok middle class, and organizes many training programs. The temple emphasizes merit-making through meditation, giving and volunteering. According to theologian Rory Mackenzie, it accepts donations from its adherents in large public meetings, promising "specific results for particular donations". The temple's appearance is orderly, and can be described as "a contemporary aesthetic", states Scott. As of 2017, the temple's worldwide following was estimated at three million practitioners. The community living at Wat Phra Dhammakaya numbered more than a thousand monks and novices, and hundreds of full-time lay employees. The temple emphasizes the revival of traditional Buddhist values, but does so through modern methods and technology. The temple emphasizes personal transformation, expressed through its slogan "World Peace through Inner Peace". The temple offers English language retreats and ordinations.

Initially, the temple was founded as a meditation center, after Maechi Chandra and the just ordained monk Luang Por Dhammajayo could no longer accommodate the rising number of participants in their activities at Wat Paknam Bhasicharoen. The center became an official temple in 1977. The temple grew exponentially during the 1980s, when the temple's training programs became widely known among the urban middle class. Wat Phra Dhammakaya expanded its area and the building of a huge stupa (pagoda) was started. During the period of the Asian economical crisis, however, the temple became subject to criticism as Luang Por Dhammajayo was charged with embezzlement and removed from his office as abbot. In 2006, he was cleared of these charges and he was restored as abbot. The temple grew further and became known for its activities in education, promotion of ethics, and scholarship projects. Under the 2014 military junta, the abbot and the temple were put under scrutiny again and Luang Por Dhammajayo was accused of receiving stolen money through the donations of a supporter. The temple has been referred to as the only influential organization in Thailand that has yet to be subdued by the ruling junta, which has shut down most opposition since it took power. The judicial processes against the abbot and the temple since the 1990s have led to much debate regarding the procedures and role of the state towards religion, a debate that has intensified during the 2017 lockdown of the temple by the junta. As of 2017, authorities have not found Luang Por Dhammajayo, and in 2018, Phrakhru Sangharak Rangsarit was assigned as the official abbot instead.

Wat Phra Dhammakaya emphasizes a culture of making merit through doing good deeds and meditation, as well as an ethical outlook on life. The temple promotes a community of kalyanamittas ('good friends') to accomplish such a culture. Although the temple emphasizes traditional Buddhist values, modern methods of propagation are used, such as a satellite television station and a distance-learning university, as well as modern management methods. In its large temple complex, the temple houses several monuments and memorials, and in its construction designs traditional Buddhist concepts are given modern forms, as the temple envisions itself as a global spiritual center.

According to Sandra Cate, an anthropologist with a focus on Southeast Asia, the historic merit-making Buddhist practice has been "taken to new extremes" by Wat Phra Dhammakaya in how it seeks monetary donations and deploys sophisticated marketing techniques and networking. The production and sale of amulets has been "a common method of financing major temple building projects", according to Newell. To raise donations in the 1990s, the Wat Phra Dhammakaya made claims of "miracle in the sky" where the sun disappeared and was replaced by a golden statue of Luang Pu Sodh or giant crystal in the sky. The accumulation of great merit (Thai: phu mi bun) has been linked in this movement to mahapurusha (great person) status, radiant complexion and spiritual perfection. Phra Mettanando has criticized these merit-making practices as a "solution to all personal and social problems" and thereby "luring faithful devotees to make ever-increasing donations". Dhammakaya fundraising efforts deploy mass marketing campaigns that relate "levels of donations to their class status", according to Scott. According to Rungrawee Chalermsripinyorat, the publications of Wat Phra Dhammakaya repeatedly reinforce the belief in the fruits of merit-making and amulets by "reproducing stories of a miraculous survival after a severe car accident, an unexplainable recovery from malignant cancer and incredible success in business after making merit".

Wat Phra Dhammakaya relies on donations and merit making to build temples and operate its organization. It runs consumer-savvy media placement and billboards to deploy "consumerist competitive and advertising strategy with the traditional belief of merit accumulation which ends up in the merchandization of merit", states sociologist Apinya Fuengfusakul. (Note: Fuengfusakul (1993), cited in Mackenzie (2007, pp. 13–14). See also Seeger (2010, p. 71 with footnote 38).) The donors are promised rewards in future rebirths, and their donations are recognized in public ceremonies. Although many of the temple's methods and teachings were not unique to Wat Phra Dhammakaya, it was noticeably criticized in the late 1990s during the Asian economic crisis due to its size and the major fundraising the temple was doing at the time. There is also tendency among teachers and practitioners to dismiss and even revile merit-making in favor of other Buddhist teachings about detachment and attaining Nirvana, for which Buddhist Studies scholar Lance Cousins has coined the term ultimatism. According to Asian Studies scholar Monica Falk, the commercialization of Buddhism has become a political issue in Thailand.

Wat Phra Dhammakaya notably focuses on the Dhammakaya meditation method and its modern teaching practices make it stand out from mainstream Thai Buddhism. The combination of the traditional and the modern can also be found in the temple's teachings, in which intellectual Buddhism and Thai folk religion meet. The temple attempts to revive the local temple's role as a spiritual community center, but does so within a format that is meant to fit with modern society and customs. According to the temple's active propagation philosophy, in the present day and age people will not come to the Buddhist temple anymore, because the temple is no longer the center of community life. The temple therefore must seek out the laypeople in society in an active way, so as to promote virtue both in the temple and at home and school. An important part of this active propagation style is the role of the layperson. The temple has been noted for its emphasis on lay participation.

According to McDaniel, Wat Phra Dhammakaya emphasizes cleanliness, orderliness and quiet, as a morality by itself, and as a way to support meditation practice. In Wat Phra Dhammakaya, ceremonies are commonly held on Sundays rather than the traditional lunar calendar-based Uposatha days. Free buses drive to the temple. Lay people joining the ceremonies are strongly encouraged to wear white, a traditional custom. No smoking, drinking or flirting is allowed on the temple terrain, nor newspapers, animals or fortune-telling. Traditional, noisy temple fairs are not held. Practitioners are also encouraged to keep things tidy and clean, through organized cleaning activities. The temple's emphasis on discipline and order is expressed in its huge and detailed ceremonies.

Wat Phra Dhammakaya teaches that paramis (lit. "perfections") are formed when people do merits consistently, and these merits become 'concentrated' (Thai: กลั่นตัว) through the passage of time. This happens when people dedicate their lives to merit-making and is taught as being necessary for everyone aiming for the Buddhist goal of release from suffering. The paramis can be practiced through the three practices of giving, morality and mental development, which includes mostly meditation. The practice of giving and merit-making, as taught by Wat Phra Dhammakaya, is therefore a practice of self-training and self-sacrifice, in which merit is dependent on intention, not merely the amount donated.

In surveys, one major reason for joining the temple's activities is the structure and clarity of the teachings. The temple's lifestyle promotes good family values and emphasizes a network of like-minded friends to facilitate spiritual development. Wat Phra Dhammakaya encourages people to persuade others to make merit, because such persuasion is in itself considered a merit. In activities of the temple, even on retreats, ample opportunity is therefore given for socializing and spiritual friendship. In teachings of the temple, practitioners are encouraged to set up kalyanamitta homes ('homes of good spiritual friends') to meditate together with friends and family, and practitioners are trained to take on leading roles.

=== Wat Rajorasarama ===
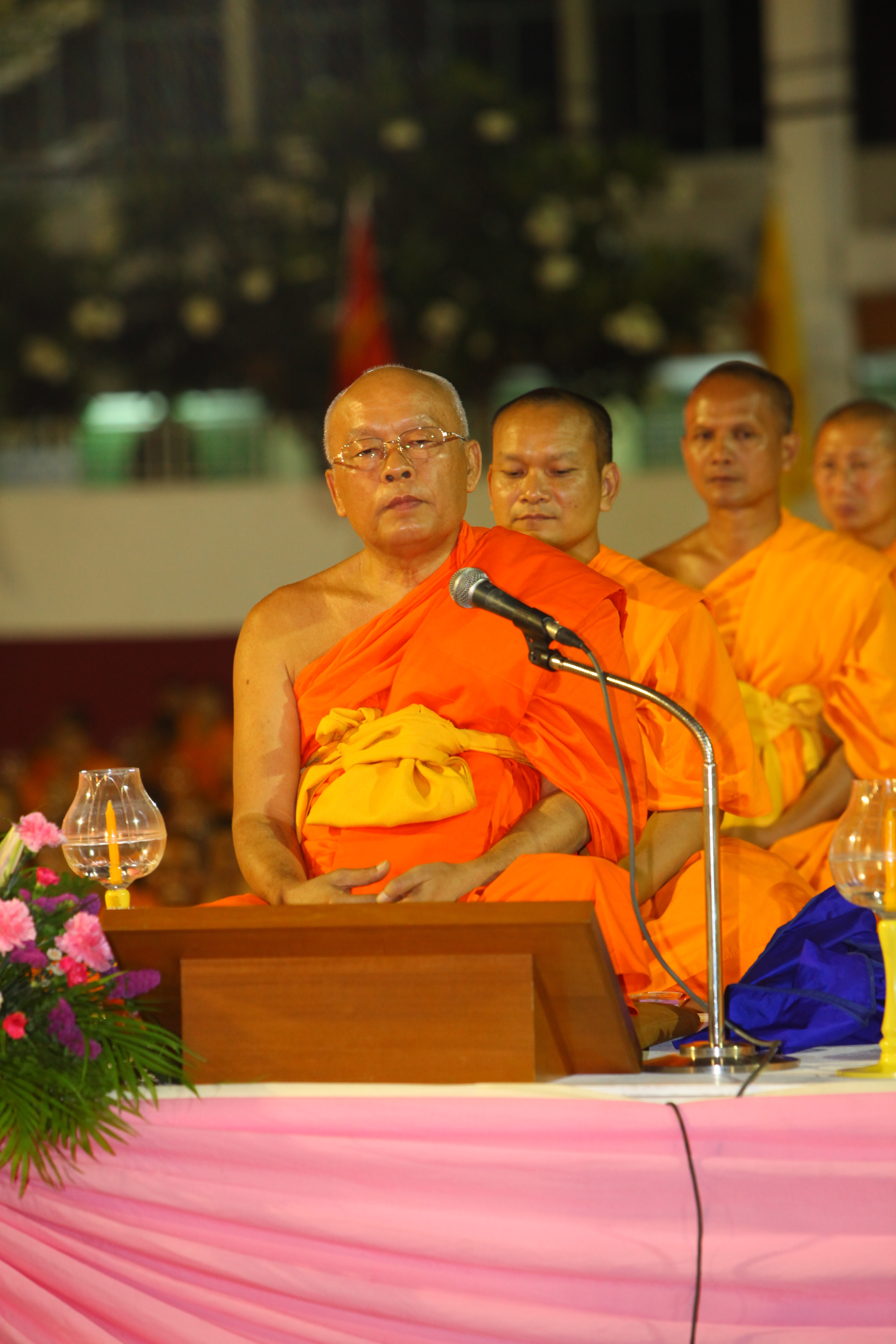
Luang Por Thongdi Suratejo from Wat Rajorasarama

Wat Rajorasarama (or for short, Wat Rajaoros; literally 'the temple of the King's son'), Bang Khun Thian District, Bangkok, originates from the Ayutthaya Kingdom era. It became a royal temple, figuring in the history of the Chakri dynasty when Prince Rama III resided and held a ceremony there to prepare for an attack during the Burmese–Siamese wars. After having spent a while at the temple preparing, the attack did not happen. Nevertheless, Rama III repaid his gratitude to the temple by renovating it from 1817 to 1831. During the renovations, texts about traditional Thai medicine and massage were carved in the temple's walls. This was done in Wat Pho as well, making for a total of thousand inscriptions, meant as a storehouse of ancient knowledge which Rama III feared might be lost during the wars. When the renovations had started, he dedicated the temple to his father Rama II, who renamed the temple "Wat Rajorasarama". The temple is often described as "the temple of King Rama III", citing his stay there during the Burmese–Siamese Wars, and the subsequent construction he started there. However, in reality, Rama III grew up in the area of Wat Chomthong, not in the palace, and was therefore familiar with the temple from his childhood onward.

In the 1950s, the temple was nearly abandoned and derelict. After the appointment of Luang Por Thongdi Suratejo as abbot in 1982, and with financial help from the government, the temple was greatly renovated. Luang Por Thongdi spent many years at Wat Paknam, completing his Pali studies there to the highest level. He held several positions in the Thai Sangha before being appointed as a member of the Supreme Sangha Council in 1992. He is well-known in Thailand for his encyclopedias and books, of which he has published over twenty, under his honorary names.

In 2001, Luang Por Thongdi made headlines when he was suddenly removed from the Sangha Council, because the Supreme Patriarch felt he "acted against the decisions of the council". During that period, Prime Minister Thaksin Shinawatra had announced several reforms of the Monastic Act, aiming for a Sangha that is more independent of the government. Luang Por Thongdi expressed his disagreement with the proposed reforms by publishing a book about them. He stated the Sangha Council was rash in its decisions, and doubted whether the monastic establishment was ready to be self-reliant. A network run by scholars and devotees stated the book was inappropriate and they pleaded with the Sangha Council to act. As soon as Luang Por Thongdi was removed from the office, practitioners of Wat Phra Dhammakaya and students of Wat Rajaoros' school protested against the decision, but Luang Por Thongdi asked them to stop in order not to express contempt of the Supreme Patriarch. (Note: Expressing criticism of the Supreme Patriarch is punishable by Thai law.) Meanwhile, PM Thaksin admitted he was "shocked" by the Supreme Patriarch's decision. Whereas the network of critics stated Luang por Thongdi "always had opposing views" and caused division, the head of the Religious Affairs Department responded "monks should have the right to air their views". When Luang Por Thongdi himself was asked how he felt about the decision, he replied "We are born in this world without anything [without position or possessions]. Having been a member of the Sangha Council, I have served Buddhism, which is the highest good in life. ... The right thing to do [now] is to accept the decision made [by the Supreme Patriarch]". Luang Por Thongdi also clarified that he was not opposed to reform and more independence from the government, but the Sangha should still have an important role in moral education, which he felt was overlooked in the reforms.

=== Wat Luang Phor Sodh Dhammakayaram ===
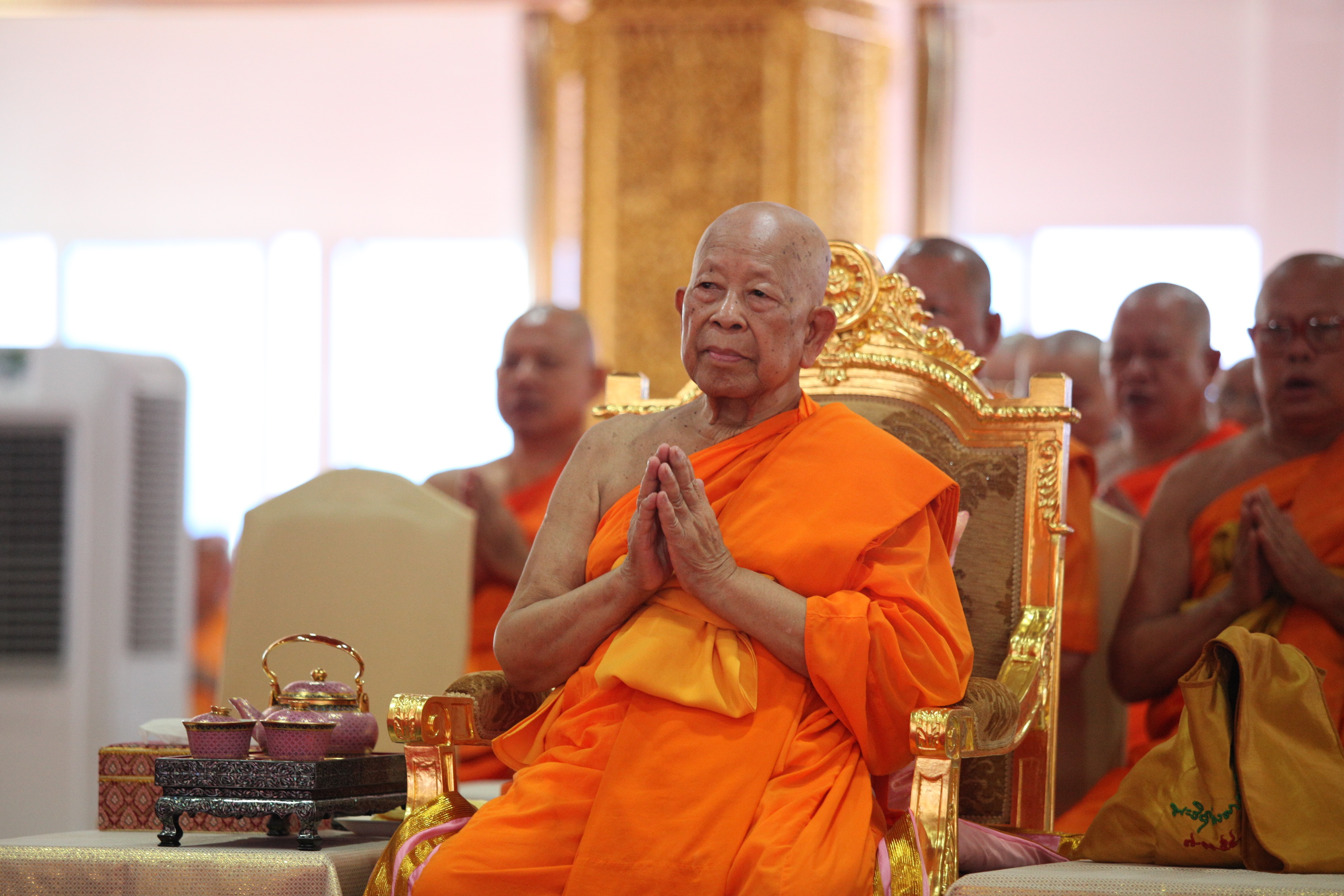
Somdet Chuang Varapuñño from Wat Paknam Bhasicharoen presiding over a ceremony

In 1982, Wat Paknam-ordained Luang Por Sermchai Jayamangalo and Phra Khru Bart Yanathiro established the Buddhabhavana Vijja Dhammakaya Institute, distancing itself from Wat Phra Dhammakaya. In 1991, the institute was changed into a temple. It is located in Ratchaburi Province, west of Bangkok, and was led by Luang Por Sermchai until 2018. He was formerly a lay meditation teacher at Wat Paknam, and a researcher and employee of the US embassy. Many of the temple's activities are done in cooperation with Wat Saket. Luang Por Sermchai taught regularly to government departments, companies, and other temples. In 2004, Luang Por Sermchai made headlines when he criticized the government's policy on legalizing gambling during a preaching on a radio program. After some members of the government responded with displeasure, a screening process for preaching on the radio was established. Luang Por Sermchai defended the radio broadcast, stating that his criticism referred to society in general, not just the government.

In 2006, there were seventy monks and thirty-three novices at the temple. Phra Khru Bart was a western monk who organized exchange student programs and gave meditation instruction and retreats in English language. English instruction is still available, though Phra Khru Bart has since died. In Thai language, the temple offers retreats, monastic ordination programs, and study retreats for families. The temple also runs its own school with Pali and Dhamma studies.

Apart from an ubosot hall (central hall for ordinations), the temple also has a memorial hall in honor of Luang Pu Sodh. In 2006, the temple started building a stupa (mound-like shaped monument). The stupa will be four storeys high and will measure 108 meters in length, width and depth. It will contain meditation rooms, Buddha images, and relics. As of 2018, the monument was still under construction.

Luang Por Sermchai had been taught about Dhammakaya meditation by Phra Veera Gaṇuttamo, teacher at Wat Paknam. On 7 October 2018, Luang Por Sermchai died, aged 90 years.

== Sources ==
- Bowers, Jeffrey (1996), Dhammakaya meditation in Thai society (Published M.A. Thesis), Thai Studies Section, vol. 5, Chulalongkorn University Press (original thesis University of Michigan), ISBN 978-974-633-207-1
- Cholvijarn, P. (2019), The Origins and Development of Sammā Arahaṃ Meditation: From Phra Mongkhon Thepmuni (Sot Candasaro) to Phra Thep Yan Mongkhon (Sermchai Jayamaṅgalo) (PhD thesis), University of Bristol, archived from the original on 6 May 2022
- Choompolpaisal, P. (22 October 2019), "Nimitta and Visual Methods in Siamese and Lao Meditation Traditions from the 17th Century to the Present Day", Contemporary Buddhism, 20 (1–2): 152–183, doi:10.1080/14639947.2018.1530836, S2CID 210445830
- Crosby, Kate; Skilton, Andrew; Gunasena, Amal (12 February 2012), "The Sutta on Understanding Death in the Transmission of Borān Meditation From Siam to the Kandyan Court", Journal of Indian Philosophy, 40 (2): 177–198, doi:10.1007/s10781-011-9151-y, S2CID 170112821
- Rhys Davids, Thomas W.; Stede, William (2015) [1st pub. 1921], The Pali-English Dictionary (1st ed.), Chipstead: Pali Text Society, ISBN 978-81-208-1144-7, archived from the original on 27 February 2021
- Dhammakaya Foundation (2005), Second to None: The Biography of Khun Yay Maharatana Upasika Chandra Khonnokyoong (PDF), archived from the original (PDF) on 19 August 2016
- Falk, Monica Lindberg (2007), Making fields of merit: Buddhist female ascetics and gendered orders in Thailand, Copenhagen: NIAS Press, ISBN 978-87-7694-019-5, archived from the original on 6 May 2022
- Fuengfusakul, Apinya (1 January 1993), "Empire of Crystal and Utopian Commune: Two Types of Contemporary Theravada Reform in Thailand", Sojourn: Journal of Social Issues in Southeast Asia, 8 (1): 153–183, JSTOR 41035731
- Fuengfusakul, Apinya (1998), ศาสนาทัศน์ของชุมชนเมืองสมัยใหม่: ศึกษากรณีวัดพระธรรมกาย [Religious Propensity of Urban Communities: A Case Study of Phra Dhammakaya Temple] (PDF), Buddhist Studies, A Four-monthly Journal from the Buddhist Studies Center, Chulalongkorn University, 4 (1), ISSN 0858-8325, archived from the original (PDF) on 28 February 2017
- Harvey, Peter (2013), An Introduction to Buddhism: Teachings, History and Practices, Cambridge University Press, ISBN 978-0-521-85942-4, archived from the original on 27 July 2020
- Heikkilä-Horn, M-J (1996), "Two Paths to Revivalism in Thai Buddhism: The Dhammakaya and Santi Asoke Movements", Temenos (32), archived from the original on 28 June 2017
- Heikkilä-Horn, Marja-Leena (2015), "Dhammakaya", in Athyal, Jesudas M. (ed.), Religion in Southeast Asia: An Encyclopedia of Faiths and Cultures, ABC-CLIO, ISBN 978-1-61069-250-2, archived from the original on 24 March 2017
- Irons, Edward A. (2008), Encyclopedia of Buddhism, Encyclopedia of World Religions, New York: Facts on File, ISBN 978-0-8160-5459-6
- Laohavanich, Mano Mettanando (1994). Meditator's handbook (2nd ed.). Bangkok, Thailand: Dhammakaya Foundation. ISBN 974-89209-2-5. OCLC 85485989.
- Mackenzie, Rory (2007), New Buddhist Movements in Thailand: Towards an understanding of Wat Phra Dhammakaya and Santi Asoke, Routledge, ISBN 978-0-203-96646-4
- Marty, M.E.; Appleby, R.S. (1994), "The Fundamentalism Project: A User Guide", Fundamentalisms Observed, The Fundamentalism Project, vol. 1, University of Chicago Press, pp. iv–xiv, ISBN 978-0-226-50878-8, archived from the original on 13 August 2021
- สองศิษย์เอกธัมมชโยโต้ขอกล่าวหาวัดพระธรรมกาย [Two of Dhammajayo's main students respond to accusations Wat Phra Dhammakaya], Matichon (in Thai), 10 January 1999, archived from the original on 30 November 2016 – via Matichon E-library
- McDaniel, Justin (2010), "Buddhists in Modern Southeast Asia", Religion Compass, 4 (11): 657–668, doi:10.1111/j.1749-8171.2010.00247.x
- Newell, Catherine Sarah (2008), Monks, meditation and missing links: continuity, "orthodoxy" and the vijja dhammakaya in Thai Buddhism (PhD thesis), Department of the Study of Religions, School of Oriental and African Studies, University of London, archived from the original on 18 March 2017
- Sasson, Vanessa R. (2012), Little Buddhas: Children and Childhoods in Buddhist Texts and Traditions, OUP USA
- Scott, Rachelle M. (2008). "Promoting World Peace Through Inner Peace: The Discourses and Technologies of Dhammakāya Proselytization". In Hackett, Rosalind I. J. (ed.). Proselytization Revisited: Rights Talk, Free Markets and Culture Wars. Equinox. pp. 231–52. ISBN 978-1-84553-227-7.
- Scott, Rachelle M. (2009), Nirvana for Sale? Buddhism, Wealth, and the Dhammakāya Temple in Contemporary Thailand, State University of New York Press, ISBN 978-1-4416-2410-9
- Seeger, Martin (2006), "Die thailändische Wat Phra Thammakai-Bewegung" [The Thai Wat Phra Dhammakaya Movement] (PDF), in Mathes, Klaus-Dieter; Freese, Harald (eds.), Buddhism in the Past and Present (in German), vol. 9, Asia-Africa Institute, University of Hamburg, pp. 121–139, archived (PDF) from the original on 27 June 2016
- Seeger, Martin (2009), "Phra Payutto and Debates 'On the Very Idea of the Pali Canon' in Thai Buddhism", Buddhist Studies Review, 26 (1): 1–31, doi:10.1558/bsrv.v26i1.1
- Seeger, M. (2010), "Theravāda Buddhism and Human Rights, Perspectives from Thai Buddhism" (PDF), Buddhist Approaches to Human Rights, pp. 63–92, archived from the original (PDF) on 29 November 2018
- Sirikanchana, Pataraporn (2010), "Dhammakaya Foundation", in Melton, J. Gordon; Baumann, Martin (eds.), Religions of the World: A Comprehensive Encyclopedia of Beliefs and Practices (2 ed.), ABC-CLIO
- Skilton, A.T.; Choompolpaisal, P (2017), "The Old Meditation (boran kammatthan), a pre-reform Theravāda meditation system from Wat Ratchasittharam: The piti section of the kammatthan matchima baep lamdap", Aséanie, 33: 83–116, doi:10.3406/asean.2014.2320, S2CID 151043487
- Snodgrass, Judith (2003), "Building Thai Modernity: The Maha Dhammakaya Cetiya", Architectural Theory Review, 8 (2): 173–185, doi:10.1080/13264820309478494, S2CID 144016460
- Sritong-on, Sorakarn (2004), คำสอนเรื่องการสร้างบารมีของวัดพระธรรมกาย [Wat Phra Dhammakaya's teachings on parami fulfilment] (Published M.A. Thesis) (in Thai), Bangkok: Dhammakaya Foundation, ISBN 974-17-7184-3, archived from the original on 21 January 2019
- Swearer, Donald K. (1994), "Fundamentalistic Movements in Theravada Buddhism", in Marty, M.E.; Appleby, R.S. (eds.), Fundamentalisms Observed, The Fundamentalism Project, vol. 1, University of Chicago Press, ISBN 978-0-226-50878-8, archived from the original on 13 August 2021
- Tanabe, Shigeharu (2016), "Resistance through Meditation: Hermits of King's Mountain in Northern Thailand", in Oscar Salemink (ed.), Scholarship and Engagement in Mainland Southeast Asia: A festschrift in honor of Achan Chayan Vaddhanaphuti, Silkworm Books, ISBN 978-616-215-118-7, archived from the original on 26 May 2021
- Taylor, J.L. (1989), "Contemporary Urban Buddhist "Cults" and the Socio-Political Order in Thailand", Mankind, 19 (2): 112–125, doi:10.1111/j.1835-9310.1989.tb00100.x
- Taylor, J. L. (2007), "Buddhism, Copying, and the Art of the Imagination in Thailand", Journal of Global Buddhism, 8, archived from the original on 31 July 2020
- Taylor, J.L. (2016). "Buddhist Modernities, Heresy and Hybrization: Thailand's Thammakaai Movement". Buddhism and Postmodern Imaginings in Thailand: The Religiosity of Urban Space. Taylor & Francis. ISBN 978-1-351-95443-3. Archived from the original on 6 May 2022.
- Williams, Paul (2008), Mahayana Buddhism: The Doctrinal Foundations (2 ed.), Taylor & Francis e-Library, ISBN 978-0-203-42847-4
- Zehner, Edwin (1990), "Reform Symbolism of a Thai Middle–Class Sect: The Growth and Appeal of the Thammakai Movement", Journal of Southeast Asian Studies, 21 (2): 402–426, doi:10.1017/S0022463400003301, JSTOR 20071200, S2CID 145465294
- Zehner, Edwin (2005), "Dhammakāya Movement", in Jones, Lindsay (ed.), Encyclopedia of Religion, vol. 4 (2 ed.), Thomson Gale, ISBN 978-0-02-909480-8
- Zehner, Edwin (June 2013), "The church, the monastery and the politician: Perils of entrepreneurial leadership in post-1970s Thailand", Culture and Religion, 14 (2): 185–203, doi:10.1080/14755610.2012.758646, S2CID 144788701
