= Paiboon Nititawan =

Thai politician

- ไพบูลย์ นิติตะวัน
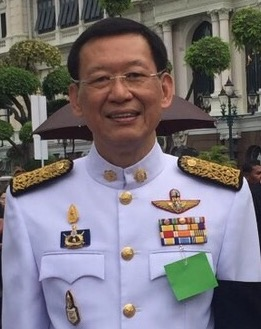

Secretary-General of the Palang Pracharath Party
- Incumbent
- Assumed office 6 September 2024

Deputy Leader of the Palang Pracharath Party
- In office 21 December 2019 – 6 September 2024

Leader of the People Reform Party
- In office 2 March 2018 – 3 September 2019

Personal details
- Born: 15 January 1954 (age 72)

Paiboon Nititawan (Thai: ไพบูลย์ นิติตะวัน; born 15 January 1954) is a Thai politician who led the People Reform Party (PRP) from 2018 to 2019 and serves as Secretary-General of the Palang Pracharath Party (PPRP). Paiboon served as a Member of Parliament for the PPRP from 2019 to 2023.
