= Dhammarakhita Samaneri =

Thai Theravada Buddhist nun

Varangghana Vanavichayen (born in 1946) is the first woman to be ordained a Theravada bhikkhuni (Buddhist nun) in Thailand. She was ordained a novice bhikkhuni on 10 February 2002 in Songdhammakalyani Monastery. The ceremony was attended by eight female monks from Sri Lanka, Taiwan, Thailand and Indonesia. It was conducted in Sri Lankan tradition. Upon the ordination she adopted the name of Dhammarakhita Samaneri. The Abbess of the nunnery was Dhammananda Bhikkhuni (Professor Chatsumarn Kabilasinga), who is also the first Theravada bhikkhuni in Thailand.

Dhammarakhita graduated with a business degree in Australia. As a lay person she worked as a secretary and translator. Before her ordination in 2002 Dhammarakhita had been a mae chii for nine years. Her ordination was surrounded by controversy and heated discussion in Thai media and politics due to the conservative views surrounding female ordination present in the country. The discussion was, however, less fierce than a year earlier when Dhammananda Bhikkhuni was ordained in Sri Lanka. In 2002 many newspapers supported the decision. Dhammarakhita defended her choice saying: "I know that there might be resistance. But I am prepared, knowing that I am doing the right thing." As of 2003, the ordination has not been yet recognised by the Thai Buddhist religious authorities.

== Private life ==
Dhammarakhita has two children. She divorced her husband while being a mae chii in order to fulfil a vow of celibacy, which is required from monks and nuns.
