= Varanggana Vanavichayen =

Varanggana Vanavichayen is the first Bhikkhuni ordained in Thailand.

== Life ==
Vanavichayen worked as a translator, and then as a secretary. She was married and had two children, but divorced her husband in order to maintain a vow of celibacy. She became a novice for nine years, prior to becoming a Bhikkhuni.

== Ordination ==
In 2002, at 55, Vanavichayen became the first Bhikkhuni ordained in Thailand. She was ordained by a Sri Lankan Bhikkhuni, and in the presence of a male Thai monk, as in accordance with Thai interpretation of Theravada scripture. The scriptures require that both a male and female monk be present in order for a woman to be ordained a monk. Seven female monks were in attendance as well. Vanavichayen was ordained in Songdhammakalyani Monastery, headed by Dhammananda Bhikkhuni (born Chatsumarn Kabilsingh), a female monk who created controversy when she was ordained as a monk in Sri Lanka and returned to Thailand. Her temple and ordination are not recognized by the Thai government. Upon Vanavichayen's ordination, she was quoted as saying, "I know that there might be resistance. But I am prepared, knowing that I am doing the right thing."

The Thai government's Deputy Chief of the Religious Affairs Department said that Vanavichayen would not be recognized as a monk. This created a problem, as the Thai constitution prohibits gender discrimination, but anyone that dresses as a monk that is not a monk faces a two-month jail sentence.
