= Luang Pu Sodh Candasaro =

Thai Buddhist monk and founder of the Dhammakaya meditation school

- หลวงปู่ สด จนฺทสโร

Personal life
- Born: Sodh Mikaewnoi สด มีแก้วน้อย; 10 October 1884 (Note: Some sources state 1885 as year of birth.) Song Phi Nong, Suphan Buri, Siam
- Died: 3 February 1959 (aged 74) Bangkok, Thailand
- Other names: Luang Pu Wat Paknam หลวงปู่วัดปากน้ำ

Religious life
- Religion: Buddhism
- Order: Mahānikāya
- Founder of: Dhammakāya
- School: Theravāda
- Dharma names: Candasaro จนฺทสโร
- Monastic name: Phramongkolthepmuni พระมงคลเทพมุนี

Senior posting
- Post: Abbot of Wat Paknam Bhasicharoen

Luang Pu Sodh Candasaro (10 October 1884 – 3 February 1959), also known as Phramongkolthepmuni, was a Thai Buddhist monk who served as the abbot of Wat Paknam Bhasicharoen from 1916 until his death in 1959. (Note: There are differing timelines on when this occurred. Some scholars indicate 1915, others 1916 or 1917.) He founded the Thai Dhammakāya school in the early 20th century. As the former abbot of Wat Paknam Bhasicharoen, he is often called Luang Pu Wat Paknam, meaning 'the Venerable Father of Wat Paknam'. He became a well-known meditation master during the interbellum and the Second World War, and played a significant role in developing Thai Buddhism during that period. He ordained the first western Buddhist monks in modern Thai history and was the meditation master of two of modern Thailand's most prominent female Buddhist figures, Maechi Chandra Khonnokyoong who founded Wat Phra Dhammakaya, and Voramai Kabilsingh, an early leader in the modern Thai Bhikkhuni ordination movement and the founder of Songdhammakalyani Monastery. He is considered by the Dhammakaya tradition to have rediscovered Vijja Dhammakaya, a meditation method believed to have been used by the Buddha himself. Since the 2000s, some scholars have pointed out that Luang Pu Sodh also played an important role in introducing Theravāda Buddhism in the West, a point previously overlooked. (Note: "Finally, had events been otherwise, the soḷasakaya meditation method, seen as somewhat marginal in its Thai context, might have become mainstream in the UK. As it is, it has been veiled by obscurity in the UK (even though it has been practised here throughout), despite its crucial historical role in the development of a native British bhikkhu-saṅgha.")

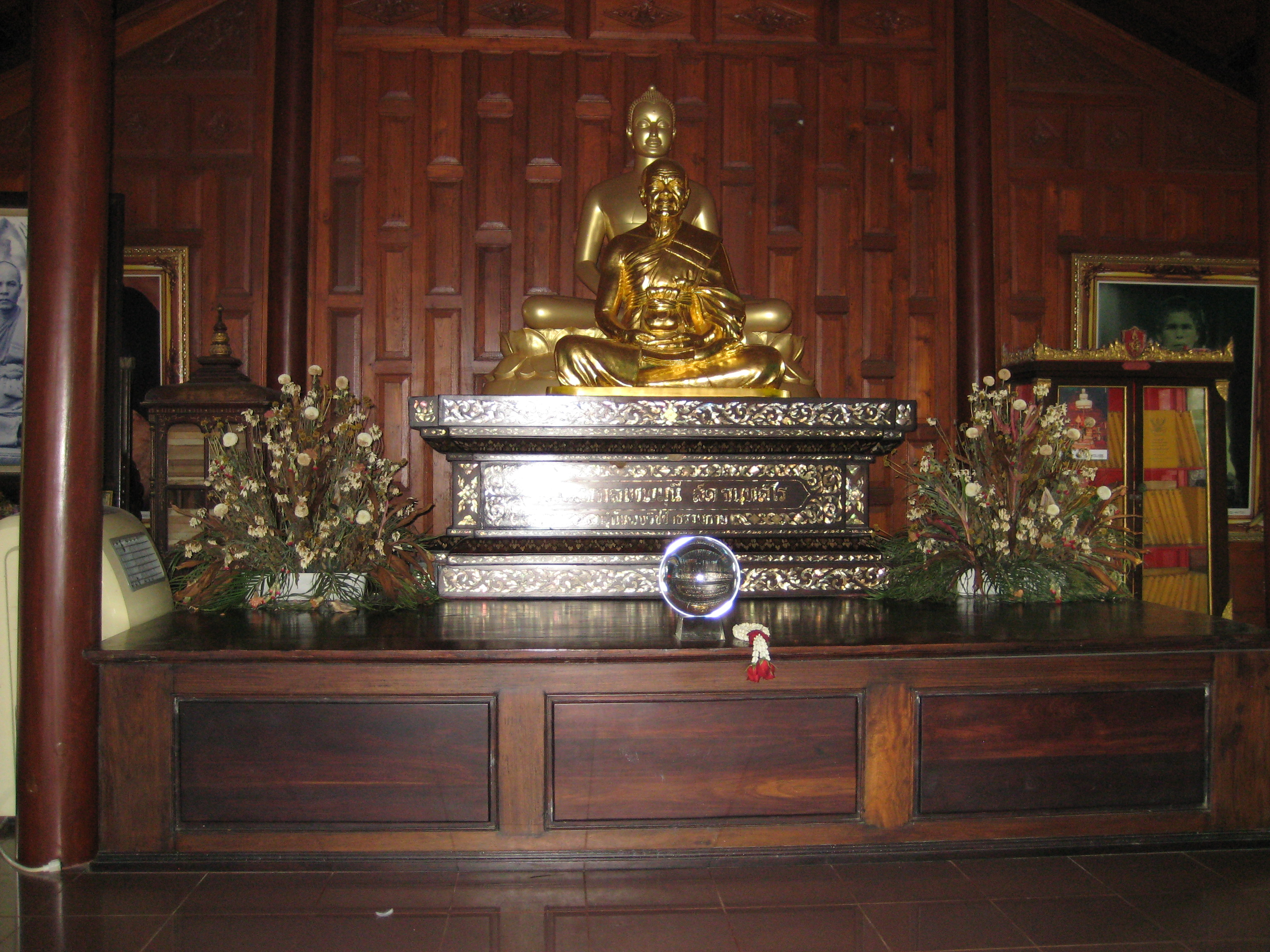
An image of Luang Pu Sodh at Wat Song Phi Nong, the temple at his birthplace

== Biography ==
=== Early life ===
According to traditional biographies, Luang Pu Sodh was born Sodh Mikaewnoi (Note: All traditional biographies relate that this was Sodh's surname. However, surnames only became common in Thailand many years later.) on 10 October 1884 to a relatively well-off family of rice merchants in Amphoe Song Phi Nong, Suphan Buri, a province 102 kilometres (63 miles) west of Bangkok in central Thailand. His father was called Ngen and his mother Soodjai. When he was nine years old, he received his first schooling in the temple in his village, by his uncle who was a Buddhist monk. He therefore became familiar with Buddhism from an early age. He also showed qualities of being an intelligent autodidact. Another habit of him was that he was compassionate towards animals. For example, he would not allow them to be in the sun too long or put them to work for too long.

When Sodh's uncle moved to Wat Hua Bho, he took Sodh with him to teach him further. After a while his uncle left the monkhood, but Ngen managed to send Sodh to study with Luang Por Sap, the abbot of Wat Bangpla. This is where Sodh learnt the Khmer language. When he was 13 years old, he finished his Khmer studies there and returned home to help his father. Father Ngen ran a rice-trading business, shipping rice by boat from Suphanburi to sell to mills in Bangkok and Nakhon Chai Si District. At the age of 14, Ngen died, and Sodh had to take responsibility for the family business, being the first son. This affected him: thieves and other threats brought home to him the futility of the household life, and at the age of 19, he desired to be ordained as a monk. One day he was particularly aware of the risk of thieves that might steal his rice and the crew being killed in the process, and he imagined what would happen if he would die that day. Then he took a vow that as long as he would survive his job, he would attempt to become ordained. He had to take care of his family first though, and saved up enough money for them that he would able to leave them. The biography of Wat Phra Dhammakaya says that he had to calculate the rate of inflation for this, and work harder than before, but finally managed to gather enough funds when he was 22 years old. He left the family company in the hands of employees he trusted.

=== Ordination ===
Sodh was ordained at Wat Songpinong in his hometown and was given the Pāli language monastic name Candasaro, Phra (phra meaning 'monk, venerable') Sodh started to study meditation and scripture, as he came across a word in Pāli language which drew his attention: aviccāpaccaya ('the factor of ignorance'). He wanted to know the meaning of the word, but his local fellow monks could not answer his question. They recommended him to further his studies in Bangkok to find an answer, which is what he did, though his mother was unwilling to see him leave.

In the area of Bangkok, Phra Sodh studied both under masters of the oral meditation tradition as well as experts in scriptural analysis, which was uncommon during that period. He learnt about a broad range of things. He also learnt many traditional arts and lores that were taught in Buddhist temples in those days, including astrology and magical practices, but later devoted himself to meditation only. In his autobiographical notes, he wrote that he practiced meditation every day, from the first day following his ordination.

After his third year after monk's ordination, Phra Sodh traveled to many places in Bangkok to study scriptures and meditation practice with teachers from established traditions. He studied scriptures at Wat Pho, Wat Arun, Wat Mahadhatu, among others, and learnt about meditation during approximately 10 years (at eight temples, including Wat Ratchasittharam, Wat Pho and Wat Chakkrawat. (Note: See Dhammakaya Foundation (2010), Bhikkhu (1960) and Newell (2008, pp. 81, 95). For the study of scriptures, see Witaya, An (9 August 2019). "หลวงพ่อสด จันทสโร วัดปากน้ำ ภาษีเจริญ" [Luang Por Sodh Candasaro, Wat Paknam Bhasicharoen]. Khao Sod (in Thai). Archived from the original on 23 December 2019. For the names of the temples where he learnt meditation, see Tanachito & Pipithvarakijjanukorn (2016, pp. 99–100). For the period of learning meditation, see "ประวัติโดยสังเขป หลวงพ่อสด วัดปากน้ำภาษีเจริญ" [Brief biography of Luang Por Sodh, Wat Paknam Bhasicharoen]. Kom Chad Luek (in Thai). 31 May 2015. Archived from the original on 5 May 2019.) At Wat Ratchasittharam, he studied a visualization meditation method with Luang Por Aium, and experienced a development in meditation regarded as important. Buddhist Studies scholar Catherine Newell states that he perceived a sphere of light there in meditation, seen as a sign of progress in meditation, (Note: In Theravāda Buddhist meditation tradition, the appearance of a bright object (Pali: nimitta) is a sign of developed concentration.) but a traditional biography written in the time of Luang Pu Sodh states this perceived breakthrough occurred at a lesser known temple called Wat Lakhontham. Buddhist Studies scholars Kate Crosby and Newell argue Wat Ratchasittharam to be crucial in Luang Pu Sodh's development, where he learnt practices of Yogavacara.

In his first years as a monk, living at Wat Pho, he had difficulty obtaining food on traditional alms rounds, where monks go house to house looking for laypeople to offer them food. This hardship led him to resolve that he would one day built a kitchen for monastics, who would then enjoy convenience in the spiritual life. During the same period, Phra Sodh persuaded his younger brother and novice (Thai: สามเณร, romanized: samanen) Samruai to join him at Wat Pho, which he did. However, in his fourth year as a monk, both Phra Sodh and his brother Samanen Samruai fell seriously ill because of smallpox. They went to a nearby hospital, and Phra Sodh recovered, but his brother did not. As a last resort, Phra Sodh brought his brother back home to Song Pi Nong to recover there, but to no avail: Samanen Samruai died, 18 years old. Before the two got ill, Phra Sodh had a dream that someone offered a bag of sand to them as a gift. He ate one handful of sand from the bag, but his brother ate two.

=== Development of Dhammakāya meditation ===
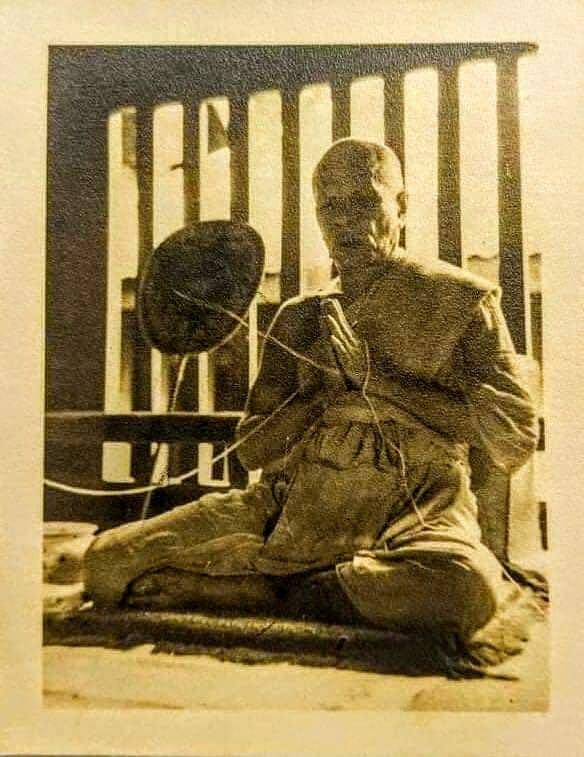
Luang Pu Sodh chanting a text after the meal

Although Phra Sodh had studied with many masters, and had mastered many important Pāli texts, he was not satisfied. He withdrew himself in the more peaceful area of his hometown twice. Some sources state he also withdrew himself in the jungles to meditate more, but Newell doubts this. In the 11th rains retreat (vassa) after his ordination, in 1916, he stayed at Wat Botbon at Bangkuvieng, Nonthaburi Province. Wat Botbon was the temple where he used to receive education as a child. As seen from Luang Pu Sodh's autobiographical notes, he reflected to himself that he had been practicing meditation for many years and had still not understood the essential knowledge which the Buddha had taught.

Thus, on the full-moon day in the 10th lunar month of 1916, he sat down in the main shrine hall of Wat Botbon, resolving not to waver in his practice of meditation. He meditated for three hours on the mantra sammā araham, which means "righteous Absolute of Attainment which a human being can achieve." Then "his mind [suddenly] became still and firmly established at the very centre of his body," and he experienced "a bright and shining sphere of Dhamma at the centre of his body, followed by new spheres, each "brighter and clearer." According to Luang Pu Sodh, this was the true Dhamma-body, or Dhammakāya, the "spiritual essence of the Buddha and nibbana [which] exists as a literal reality within the human body," and the true Self (as opposed to the non-self). (Note: In some respects its teachings resemble the Buddha-nature doctrines of Mahayana Buddhism. Paul Williams has commented that this view of Buddhism is similar to ideas found in the shentong teachings of the Jonang school of Tibet made famous by Dolpopa Sherab Gyaltsen.) According to Mackenzie, "Luang Phaw Sot sought to relate his breakthrough to the Satipaṭṭhāna Sutta. He interpreted a phrase which is normally understood as 'contemplating the body as a body' as 'contemplating the body in the body'. The Mahāsatipaṭṭhāna Sutta contains a series of expressions for contemplating the body as body, feelings as feelings, etc. but is literally translated from Pali as "in" rather than "as". Luang Pu Sodh did understand the phrase "body in body" as meaning being mindful of the body, but also understood it as extending the mindfulness to the inner bodies for practitioners who could see them with meditative attainments, a literal interpretation of "in".

Convinced that he had attained the core of the Buddha's teaching, Phra Sodh started a new chapter in his life, which marked the start of Dhammakāya meditation as a tradition. Phra Sodh devoted the rest of his life to teaching and furthering the depth of knowledge of Dhammakāya meditation, a meditation method which he also called Vijjā Dhammakāya, 'the direct knowledge of the Dhammakāya'. Temples in the tradition of Wat Paknam Bhasicharoen, together called the Dhammakaya tradition, believe that this method was the method the Buddha originally used to attain enlightenment, but was lost 500 years after the Buddha's parinirvana. The event of the attainment of the Dhammakāya is usually described by the Dhammakaya tradition in miraculous and cosmic terms. For example, it is mentioned that heavy rains preceded the event.

=== Life as an abbot ===
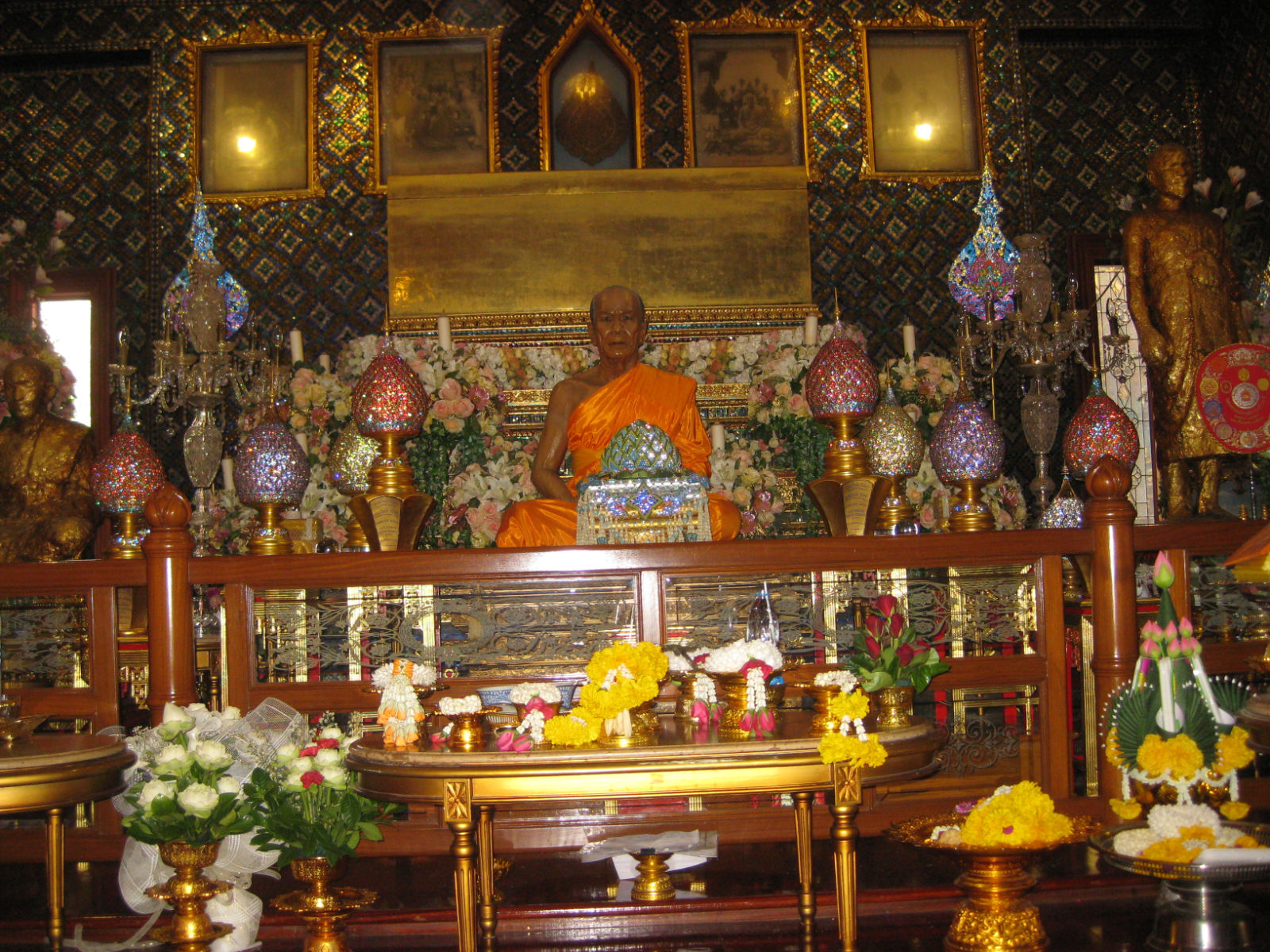
Statue of Luang Pu Sodh Candasaro at Wat Paknam Bhasicharoen, placed above his coffin.

Phra Sodh spent much time teaching. Even when he was still at Wat Pho, he would teach Pāli language in his own monastic cell to other monks and novices. He had also restored an abandoned temple in his hometown Song Phi Nong and set up a school for Buddhist studies for lay people in Wat Phrasriratanamahathat in Suphanburi. He enrolled for the reformed Pāli examinations, but did not pass. He did not enroll again, even though he was a more than capable scholar: he believed that having obtained an official Pāli degree, he might be recruited for administrative work in the Saṅgha (monastic community), which he did not aim for. Phra Sodh recalled that if he had passed, it would have been detrimental for his meditation practice. Newell suggests that he failed the exam on purpose in response to ongoing monastic reforms, as other monks during this period had done.

Nevertheless, because of his work, he was noticed by leading monks in the Saṅgha. Still in 1916, Somdet Phuean, the monastic governor of Phasi Charoen and one of Phra Sodh's teachers, appointed Phra Sodh as a caretaker abbot (Thai: ผู้รักษาการเจ้าอาวาส) of Wat Paknam Bhasicharoen, then located in Thonburi. (Note: See Scott (2009, p. 67). For the fact that Somdet Phuean was Phra Sodh's teacher, see Vuddhasilo (2003, p. 30).) Somdet Phuean did not want Phra Sodh to travel around without belonging to a single temple, and having a position as a caretaker abbot would connect Phra Sodh's life to one. Initially, Somdet Phuean appointed Phra Sodh for a temporary position of only three months, to which Phra Sodh reluctantly agreed. However, shortly after Phra Sodh had installed himself in Wat Paknam, Somdet Phuean gave him the full position of abbot. To make it impossible to leave the job, in 1921, Somdet Phuean gave an honorary title to Phra Sodh that was connected with the position: "Phrakhru Samanadham-samathan". However, Phra Sodh is usually referred to as "Luang Por Sodh" or "Luang Pu Sodh".

In 1916, Thonburi was not part of Bangkok yet, and had no bridge to connect it to Bangkok. Wat Paknam looked neglected, with grass growing on the buildings, and only 13 monks lived there. (Note: For the neglect, see Singhon (2003, p. 38). For the 13 monks, see Vuddhasilo (2003, p. 32).) Wat Paknam faced social and disciplinary problems, and required a good leader. Luang Pu Sodh promoted and enforced strict monastic discipline. He was able to change Wat Paknam Bhasicharoen, a temple that was almost vacant, into a temple with hundreds of monks, a school for Buddhist studies, but also a government-approved primary school with a mundane curriculum, and a kitchen to make the temple self-sufficient. Apart from monastic residents, the kitchen would also provide food for all the lay visitors of the temple. The fact Luang Pu Sodh was able to provide for his monks and novices through a kitchen was a feat at the time, when most monastics would have to rely on alms. Later, after Luang Pu Sodh's death, Phra Thammathassanathon, then abbot of Wat Chana Songkhram, admitted that this achievement made him want to know more about Luang Pu Sodh and keep in contact with him.

Wat Paknam became a popular center of meditation teaching. Luang Pu Sodh emphasized the development of people more than construction: besides developing a large community of monks in the temple (in 1959, 500 monks, the highest in Thailand at the time), he also set up a community of mae chis (nuns), with separate monastic cells and meditation rooms. Mae chis played an important role in Wat Paknam's propagation of Buddhism. In the first period, Luang Pu Sodh's work was not appreciated by the monastic governor of the village, some other monks and many lay people who, according to biographies, formerly ran illegal businesses within the temple and did not appreciate Luang Pu Sodh changing the temple. Once he was even shot at, though not hurt. (Note: For the illegal businesses, see Scott (2009, p. 67). For the governor, see Vuddhasilo (2003, p. 30).) (Note: In another version of the story, eight criminals came at night to kill Luang Pu Sodh. Luang Pu Sodh was not shot, however, as a close aide who protected him came to his rescue in time, using a sword to ward the delinquents off. The criminals left.) Luang Pu Sodh had such a strong relationship with the temple, that he hardly ever left it. He seldom accepted invitations that involved accommodation outside the temple. He became known for his motto "We monks should not fight back, neither flee, and we will win each time". (Note: Vuddhasilo (2003, p. 31), "Phra rao tong mai su, tong mai ni, chana thukthi." [พระเราต้องไม่สู้ ต้องไม่หนี ชนะทุกที])

Soon after his appointment as temporary abbot, he was appointed fully as abbot of Wat Paknam, where he remained until his death in 1959. For his life and work he was given monastic and royal honorific names, that is Phrakhru Samanadham-samathan (in 1921), Phrabhavanakosolthera (in 1949), Phramongkolratmuni (in 1955), and finally Phramongkolthepmuni (in 1957). The last three royal titles were given late, due to the fact that the temple was not under royal patronage, and therefore received less attention from the royal family than other temples. (Note: In modern times, Thai monks are given titles by the royal family in credit for their merits in developing Buddhism.)

=== Teaching meditation ===
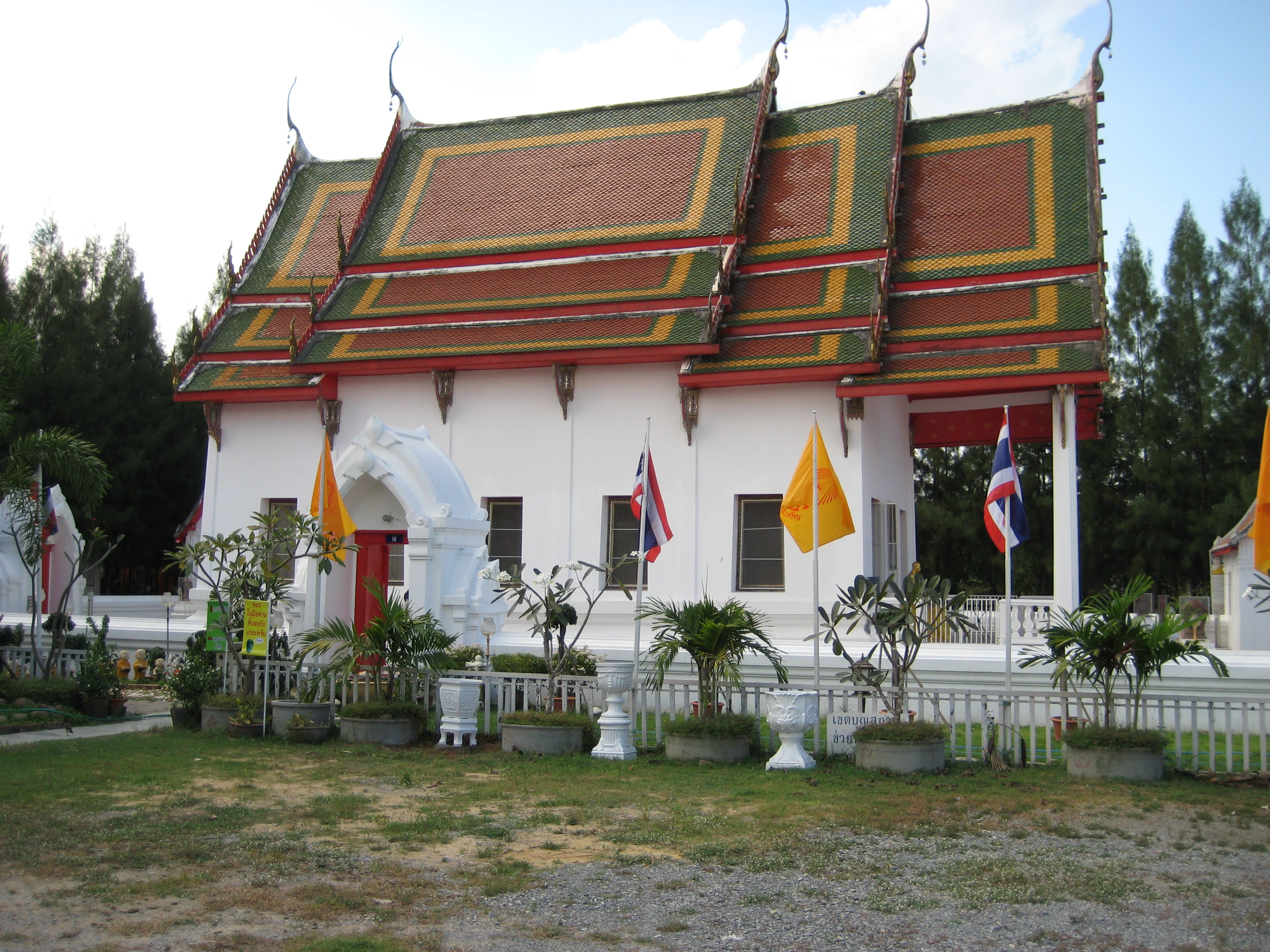
The Ubosot hall of Wat Bot Bon

During a ministry of over half-a-century, Luang Pu Sodh taught Dhammakāya meditation continuously, guiding meditation every Thursday and preaching on Buddhism on Sundays and uposatha days. Luang Pu Sodh would distribute an introductory book about meditation to practitioners. At first, the Dhammakāya meditation method drew criticism from the Thai Saṅgha authorities, because it was a new method. Discussion within the Saṅgha led to an inspection at Wat Paknam, but it was concluded that Luang Pu Sodh's method was correct.

In teaching meditation, Luang Pu Sodh would challenge others to meditate so that they might verify for themselves the benefits of Dhammakāya meditation. He organized a team of his most gifted meditation practitioners and set up a 'meditation factory of direct knowledge' (Thai: โรงงานทำวิชชา). These practitioners, mostly monks and mae chis, would meditate in an isolated location at the temple, in shifts for 24 hours a day, one shift lasting for six hours. Their "brief" was to devote their lives to meditation research for the common good of society. In the literature of the Dhammakāya tradition many accounts are found about Dhammakāya meditation solving problems in society and the world at large. Dhammakāya meditation was—and still is—believed to bring forth certain psychic powers (Pali: abhiññā), such as travelling to other spheres of existence, and reading people's minds. Publications describe that Dhammakāya meditation was used during the Second World War to prevent Thailand from being bombed. Luang Pu Sodh also used meditation in healing people, for which he became widely known. An often quoted anecdote is the story of Somdet Puean, the abbot of Wat Pho, who, after meditating with Luang Pu Sodh, recovered from his illness. An important student in the meditation factory was eventual Wat Phra Dhammakaya founder Maechi Chandra Khonnokyoong, who Luang Pu Sodh once described as "first among many, second to none" in terms of meditation skill, according to the biography of Wat Phra Dhammakaya.

=== Death ===
In 1954, Luang Pu Sodh made an announcement that he would die soon, and instructed his students to continue their duties without him, especially to propagate Dhammakāya meditation. A year later, he began to suffer from a disease and his condition became less and less stable. In 1956, he was diagnosed with hypertension and spent some time in a military hospital. (Note: See Witaya, An (9 August 2019). "หลวงพ่อสด จันทสโร วัดปากน้ำ ภาษีเจริญ" [Luang Por Sod Candasaro, Wat Paknam Bhasicharoen]. Khao Sod (in Thai). Archived from the original on 23 December 2019; Cook (1981, p. 76); and "ประวัติโดยสังเขป หลวงพ่อสด วัดปากน้ำภาษีเจริญ" [Brief biography of Luang Por Sodh, Wat Paknam Bhasicharoen]. Kom Chad Luek (in Thai). 31 May 2015. Archived from the original on 5 May 2019. For the type of hospital, see the Kom Chad Luek article.) He complained little and was in good spirits, eventually dying in peace on 3 February 1959 in Wat Paknam. His body was not cremated as was common, but embalmed, so that after his death people would still come to see his coffin and support Wat Paknam.

== Legacy ==
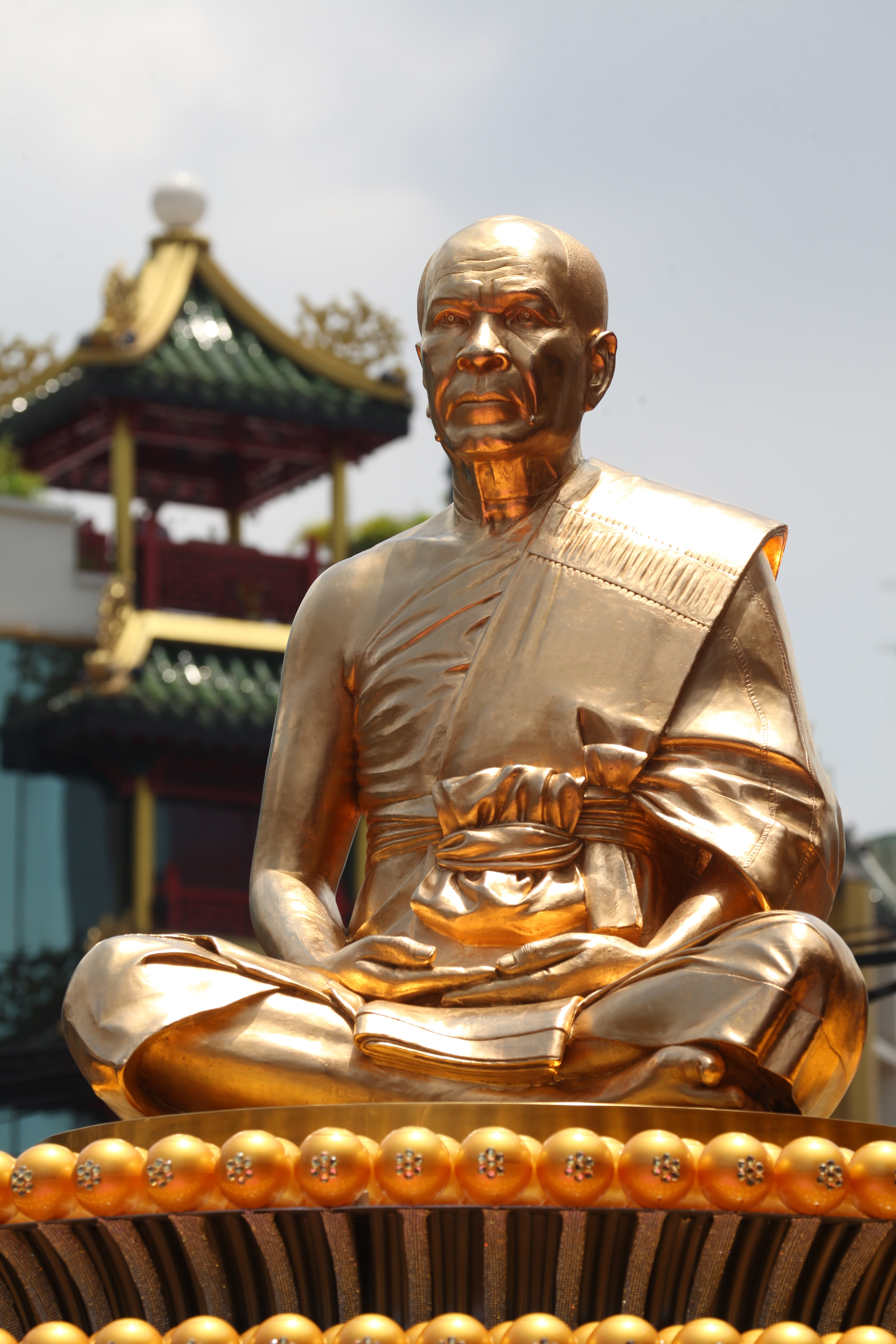
Golden statue of Luang Pu Sodh Candasaro, as used in a ceremony organized by Wat Phra Dhammakaya

Besides meditation, Luang Pu Sodh promoted the study of Buddhism as well. In this combination he was one of the pioneers in Thai Buddhism. In 1939, Luang Pu Sodh set up a Pāli Institute at Wat Paknam, which is said to have cost 2,500,000 baht. Luang Pu Sodh financed the building through the production of amulets, which is common in Thai Buddhism. (Note: See Newell (2008). Vuddhasilo (2003, p. 34) mentions an institute of Buddhist education which Luang Pu Sodh built in 1950, costing 3,000,000 baht.) The institute became the most modern educational institute in Buddhism for that time. The kitchen which he built was the fulfillment of an intention which he had since his first years at Wat Pho, when he experienced difficulty in finding food. It also resulted in monks having more time to study Buddhism.

Luang Pu Sodh took part in the construction of the Phutthamonthon, an ambitious project of Prime Minister Phibun Songkhram in the 1950s. The park was built to host the 2500 Buddha Jayanti celebrations. Judging from the chapel at the centre of the Phutthamonthon, dedicated to Luang Pu Sodh and Dhammakāya meditation, as well as the amulets Luang Pu Sodh issued to raise funds for the park, Newell speculates Luang Pu Sodh assumed a significant role in building the park and had an important relation with PM Phibun.

According to the biography by Wat Phra Dhammakaya, Luang Pu Sodh did not endorse "magical practices" that are common in Thai Buddhism, such as fortune-telling and spells for good luck. He did, however, often heal people through meditation, and Luang Pu Sodh's amulets were—and are still—widely venerated for their attributed powers.

=== Introducing Buddhism in the world ===
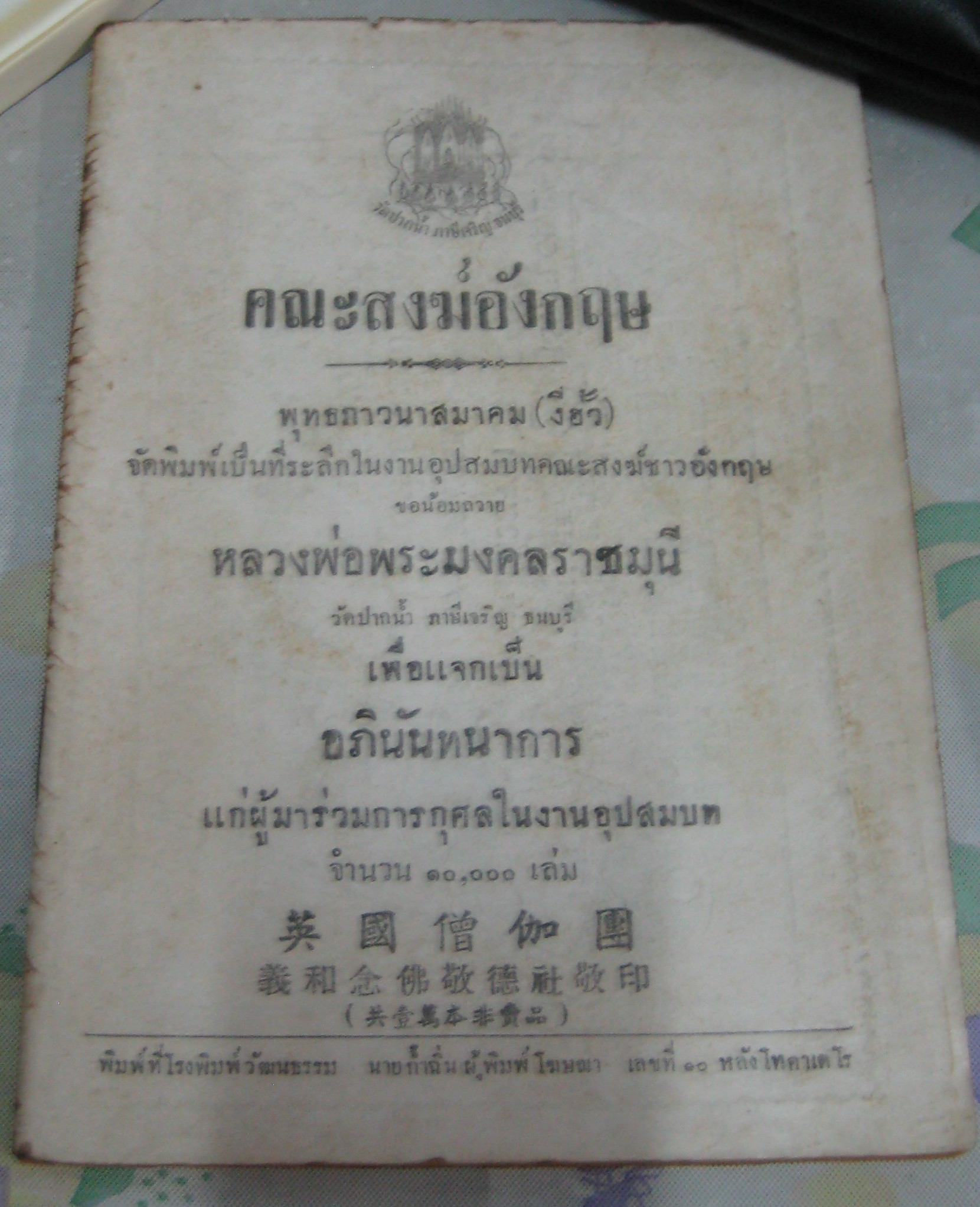
Booklet distributed during the ordination of British monks. 10,000 copies were made, says the cover.

Luang Pu Sodh had a great interest to introduce Dhammakāya meditation outside of Thailand. Wat Paknam already published international magazines and leaflets in the time Kapilavaḍḍho, his first Western student, started living under the guidance of Luang Pu Sodh. The periodical of the temple was in both Thai and English, and at certain occasions booklets would be published in Chinese as well. In old periodicals of the temple visits from high-standing monks from Japan and China have been recorded, and Dhammakāya meditation is still passed on by Japanese Shingon Buddhists that used to practice at Wat Paknam. Luang Pu Sodh was also the teacher of Voramai Kabilsingh, an early pioneer of the modern Thai Bhikkhuni ordination movement and founder of the Songdhammakalyani Monastery, the first monastery for Theravada Bhikkhuni in Thailand, where Dhammakāya meditation is still practiced today.

Luang Pu Sodh was one of the first Thai preceptors to ordain people outside Thailand as Buddhist monks. He ordained the Englishman William Purfurst (a.k.a. Richard Randall) as "Kapilavaḍḍho" at Wat Paknam in 1954. Kapilavaḍḍho returned to Britain to found and help lead the English Sangha Trust and English Sangha Association. (Note: See Oliver (1979, p. 102) and Snelling (1987, p. 262). For the association, see Webb (2016, p. 185).) Former director of the trust Terry Shine described Kapilavaḍḍho as the "man who started and developed the founding of the first English Theravada Sangha in the Western world". He was the first Englishman to be ordained in Thailand, but disrobed in 1957, shortly after his mentor Phra Ṭhitavedo had a disagreement with Luang Pu Sodh and left Wat Paknam. He was ordained again in England under Chao Khun Sobhana, and became the director of the English Sangha Trust in 1967. (Note: See Skilton (2013, p. 165) and Newell (2008, p. 91). For the person ordaining him, see Webb (2016, p. 187).) Luang Pu Sodh ordained another British monk, Peter Morgan, with the name Paññāvaḍḍho Bhikkhu. After his death he would continue under the guidance of Ajahn Maha Bua. Phra Paññāvaḍḍho remained in the monkhood until his death in 2004, when he had ordained for the longest of all westerners in Thailand. He hardly ever returned to the West, however. A third monk, formerly known as George Blake, was a Brit of Jamaican origin, and was the first Jamaican to be ordained as a Buddhist monk. He was ordained as Vijjāvaḍḍho, and later disrobed, becoming a well-known therapist in Canada.

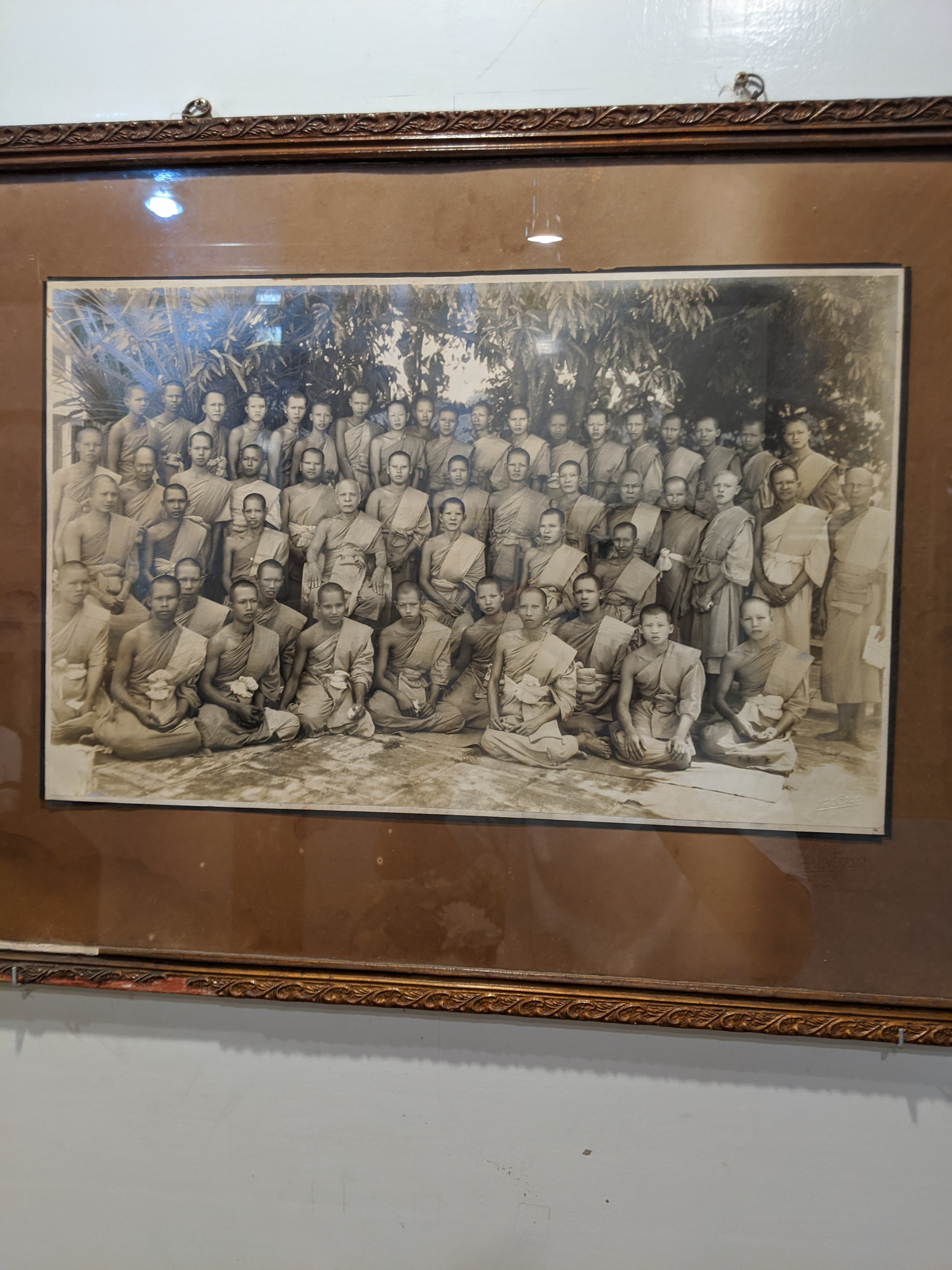
Luang Pu Sodh (centre left) sitting with the monks of Wat Paknam

The ordination of Vijjāvaḍḍho, Paññāvaḍḍho and another British monk called Saddhāvaḍḍho (Robert Albison) was a major public event in Thailand, attracting an audience of 10,000 people. Namgyal Rinpoché (Leslie George Dawson), a teacher in the Tibetan Buddhist tradition, also studied for a while under Luang Por Sodh, but he was not ordained under him. One of the last Western students in the time of Luang Pu Sodh was Terrence Magness, who learnt Dhammakāya meditation at Wat Paknam as well, from the lay teacher Achan Kalayawadee. He was ordained under the name Suratano, and wrote a biography about Luang Pu Sodh.

In summary, Luang Pu Sodh had a significant impact on Thai Buddhism, both in Thailand and abroad. He helped pioneer the combination of study and meditation, traditionally two separate monastic vocations. Newell points out that in this he even preceded Phra Phimontham, the administrator monk who introduced the New Burmese Method of meditation in Thailand. Luang Pu Sodh ordained a British monk that helped pioneer Buddhism in the United Kingdom. Furthermore, he started many developments that were continued by Wat Phra Dhammakaya, later to become the largest temple of Thailand.

In Wat Phra Dhammakaya a memorial hall was built in honor of Luang Pu Sodh, and in Wat Paknam, a charity foundation was started in his name. In some years, on 3 February, Wat Paknam holds a national memorial of him, which is joined by hundreds of monks. Wat Phra Dhammakaya holds city pilgrimages along important places in the life of Luang Pu. In 2020, the pilgrimage was held for the eighth time.

== Publications ==
- Phramonkolthepmuni (2006) "Visudhivaca: Translation of Morradok Dhamma of Luang Phaw Wat Paknam" (Bangkok, 60th Dhammachai Education Foundation) ISBN 978-974-94230-3-5
- Phramonkolthepmuni (2008) "Visudhivaca: Translation of Morradok Dhamma of Luang Phaw Wat Paknam", Vol.II (Bangkok, 60th Dhammachai Education Foundation) ISBN 978-974-349-815-2

== Sources ==
- Awirutthapanich, Pichit; Pantiya, Punchai (2017), หลักฐาน ธรรมกายในคัมภีร์พุทธโบราณ ฉบับวิชาการ 1 [Dhammakaya Evidence in Ancient Buddhist Books, Academic Version 1], Songklanakarin Journal of Social Sciences and Humanities, 23 (2), archived from the original on 10 March 2018
- Bhikkhu, Suratano (1960), The Life and Teaching of Chao Khun Mongkol-Thepmuni and The Dhammakāya (PDF), (Terry Magness), triple-gem.net, archived from the original (PDF) on 5 July 2016
- Buddhabhavana Society (Ngee Hua) (1956), คณะสงฆ์อังกฤษ (ที่ระลึกในงานอุปสมนทคณะสงฆ์อังกฤษ) [The English Sangha (gift at ordination ceremony of English Sangha)] (in Thai), Watanatham Publishers
- Chattinawat, Nathathai (2009), สถานภาพของแม่ชี: กรณีศึกษาแม่ชีวัดปากน้ําภาษีเจริญ กรุงเทพฯ [Nun's status: A Case Study of Wat Paknam Bhasicharoen] (M.A. thesis) (in Thai), College of Interdisciplinary Studies, Thammasat University, archived from the original on 23 March 2016
- Cheng, Tun-jen; Brown, Deborah A. (2015), Religious Organizations and Democratization: Case Studies from Contemporary Asia, Routledge, ISBN 978-1-317-46105-0
- Cholvijarn, P. (2019), The Origins and Development of Sammā Arahaṃ Meditation: From Phra Mongkhon Thepmuni (Sot Candasaro) to Phra Thep Yan Mongkhon (Sermchai Jayamaṅgalo) (PhD thesis), University of Bristol, archived from the original on 6 May 2022
- Cook, Nerida M. (1981), The position of nuns in Thai Buddhism: The parameters of religious recognition (Ph.D. Thesis), Research School of Archaeology and Anthropology, Australian National University, doi:10.25911/5d78d6049c808, archived from the original on 16 June 2019
- Crosby, Kate; Skilton, Andrew; Gunasena, Amal (12 February 2012), "The Sutta on Understanding Death in the Transmission of Borān Meditation From Siam to the Kandyan Court", Journal of Indian Philosophy, 40 (2): 177–198, doi:10.1007/s10781-011-9151-y, S2CID 170112821
- Dhammakaya Foundation (2010), The Life and Times of Luang Phaw Wat Paknam (4th ed.), Dhammakaya Foundation, ISBN 978-974-89409-4-6
- Fuengfusakul, Apinya (1998), ศาสนาทัศน์ของชุมชนเมืองสมัยใหม่: ศึกษากรณีวัดพระธรรมกาย [Religious Propensity of Urban Communities: A Case Study of Phra Dhammakaya Temple] (PDF) (published Ph.D.), Buddhist Studies Center, Chulalongkorn University, archived (PDF) from the original on 28 February 2017
- Harvey, Peter (2013), An Introduction to Buddhism: Teachings, History and Practices, Cambridge University Press, ISBN 978-0-521-85942-4, archived from the original on 27 July 2020
- "Ordain Buddhist Monk", Jet, 8 (26), Johnson, 3 November 1955
- Litalien, Manuel (January 2010), Développement social et régime providentiel en thaïlande: La philanthropie religieuse en tant que nouveau capital démocratique [Social Development and a Providential Regime in Thailand: Religious Philanthropy as a New Form of Democratic Capital] (PDF) (Ph.D. Thesis, published as a monograph in 2016) (in French), Université du Québec à Montréal, archived (PDF) from the original on 6 June 2018
- Mackenzie, Rory (2007), New Buddhist Movements in Thailand: Towards an understanding of Wat Phra Dhammakaya and Santi Asoke (PDF), Routledge, ISBN 978-0-203-96646-4, archived from the original (PDF) on 22 October 2020
- Newell, Catherine Sarah (2008), Monks, meditation and missing links: continuity, "orthodoxy" and the vijja dhammakaya in Thai Buddhism (Ph.D. Thesis), Department of the Study of Religions, School of Oriental and African Studies, University of London, doi:10.25501/SOAS.00007499, archived from the original on 18 March 2017
- Oliver, I. (1979), Buddhism in Britain, Rider and Company, ISBN 978-0-09-138161-5, archived from the original on 6 May 2022
- Rinaldi, Luc (29 June 2014), "'Are you sure you're not doing some African black magic?'", Maclean's, Rogers Media, archived from the original on 22 December 2017
- Scott, Rachelle M. (2009), Nirvana for Sale? Buddhism, Wealth, and the Dhammakāya Temple in Contemporary Thailand (PDF), State University of New York Press, ISBN 978-1-4416-2410-9, archived from the original (PDF) on 7 August 2015
- Skilton, Andrew (28 June 2013), "Elective affinities: the reconstruction of a forgotten episode in the shared history of Thai and British Buddhism – Kapilavaḍḍho and Wat Paknam", Contemporary Buddhism, 14 (1): 149–168, doi:10.1080/14639947.2013.785247, S2CID 143082207
- Tanachito, Phramaha Chit; Pipithvarakijjanukorn, Phrakhru (2016), การปฏิบัติ และการสอบอารมณ์กรรมฐานตามหลักพระพุทธศาสนาเถรวาทในประเทศไทย [The Practice and Personal Teaching of Meditation Methods in Thai Theravāda Buddhism], Mahachulalongkornrajavidyalaya University
- Rawlinson, A. (1994), "The Transmission of Theravada Buddhism to the West", in Masefield, P.; Wiebe, D. (eds.), Aspects of Religion: Essays in Honour of Ninian Smart, Lang, p. 360, ISBN 978-0-8204-2237-4, archived from the original on 6 May 2022
- Singhon (2003) [1954], "วัดปากน้ำปี พ.ศ ๒๔๙๗ [Wat Paknam in 1954]", in Singhon (ed.), People from the Beginning of Vijjā (in Thai), vol. 3, Sukhumwit Printing, ISBN 978-974-91493-7-9
- Sivaraksa, Sulak (1987), "Thai Spirituality" (PDF), Journal of the Siam Society, 75: 85, archived (PDF) from the original on 18 March 2017
- Snelling, J. (1987), The Buddhist Handbook: A Complete Guide to Buddhist Teaching, Practice, History, and Schools, Inner Traditions, ISBN 978-0-89281-319-3, archived from the original on 11 November 2020
- Vasi, Prawase (1987), สวนโมกข์ ธรรมกาย สันติอโศก [Suan Mokh, Thammakai, Santi Asok], Mo Chaoban Publishing, ISBN 9789748757230, archived from the original on 6 May 2022
- Vuddhasilo, Phramaha Wichai (2003) [1954], "ชีวประวัติหลวงพ่อวัดปากน้ำ ภาษีเจริญ พระภาวนาโกศลเถร [The history of Luang Phor Wat Paknam Bhasicharoen, Phrabhavanakosolthera]", in Singhon (ed.), People from the Beginning of Vijjā (in Thai), vol. 3, Sukhumwit Printing, ISBN 978-974-91493-7-9
- Webb, Russell (3 June 2016), "Hampstead Buddhist Vihāra", Contemporary Buddhism, 17 (1): 184–194, doi:10.1080/14639947.2016.1189132, S2CID 147790641
- Williams, Paul (2009), Mahayana Buddhism: The Doctrinal Foundations (PDF) (2 ed.), Routledge, ISBN 978-1-134-25057-8, archived from the original (PDF) on 5 June 2018

== Biographies ==
- Official biography by Wat Phra Dhammakaya, compiled based on numerous Thai sources
- Updated official biography by Wat Phra Dhammakaya, closer to Thai originals, but less comprehensive
- Biography by British Malaysian who ordained at Wat Paknam Bhasicharoen and met Luang Pu Sodh
- Biography by close lay student
