= Voramai Kabilsingh =

Voramai Kabilsingh (Thai: วรมัย กบิลสิงห์; RTGS: Woramai Kabinsing), also known by her monastic name Ta Tao Fa Tzu (Chinese: 大道法師; pinyin: Dàdào Fǎshī, was born Lamai Kabilsingh (Thai: ลมัย กบิลสิงห์; RTGS: Lamai Kabinsing; 6 April 1908; died 23 June 2003), was the first modern Thai bhikkhuni. She founded Songdhammakalyani Monastery, the first modern monastery in Thailand for bhikkhuni and was the mother of Dhammananda Bhikkhuni, the current abbess of Songdhammakalyani Monastery.

== Early life ==
Voramai's father had wanted sons and was disappointed when her mother could not produce a son, so he left for China. Later her sister married a merchant and she would work at their store where she learned English. She also was taught by Catholic nuns at Assumption Girls' College. She developed a passion for writing and journalism. She was also, unusual for a Thai woman of that era, excelled at sword fighting. While studying at a physical education college she met her husband. The marriage was largely an arrangement, so she could avoid being married to a Japanese man. It did lead her to gain the name "Voramai", but his political career ended up causing some physical distance. Despite that they remained supportive of each other while living apart.

== Spiritual beginnings ==
During a tumor scare in 1954, Voramai was visited by Mae chi Thongsuk, who told her she did not need surgery. Voramai went through with the surgery anyways but to the doctors' surprise the tumor was gone. Following the incident, Voramai went to visit Mae chi Thongsuk's master, Luang Pu Sodh, at Wat Paknam who said to her "Didn't I tell you you didn't need the operation?". This incident has been credited with sparking her interest in the spiritual life. Voramai then went on to study meditation at Wat Paknam and then began publishing a magazine on Buddhism and meditation in 1955.

== Ordination ==
In 1956, Voramai took lower ordination when her daughter, now Dhammananda Bhikkhuni, was ten. She wore yellow robes to distinguish herself from mae chi or bhikkhus. Voramai eventually gained a following, with other Thai women joining her as yellow robed nuns. In 1957, she purchased land in Nakhon Pathom to build Songdhammakalyani Monastery for women. She later learned higher ordination as a full bhikkhuni was possible outside of Thailand and was ordained in a Dharmaguptaka lineage in Taiwan in 1971 with the monastic name Ta Tao Fa Tzu, the Thai equivalent of the name being Maha Bodhi Dhammacarya. After her ordination, Voramai became a prominent teacher and became involved in many conferences and organizations for Buddhist women. In 2001, Voramai's daughter took ordination as a samaneri, or female novice monk. A year later Voramai told her daughter she "had to leave", but her daughter said that she cannot leave until she received full ordination, to which Voramai agreed. In February 2003, Voramai's daughter received full ordination in Sri Lanka and became known as Dhammananda Bhikkhuni, the first modern Thai women to be ordained as a bhikkhuni in the Theravada lineage. Afterwards, Voramai died in June 2003.
