= Dhammananda Bhikkhuni =

Thai bhikkhuni and academic (born 1944)

Dhammananda
- ธัมมนันทา
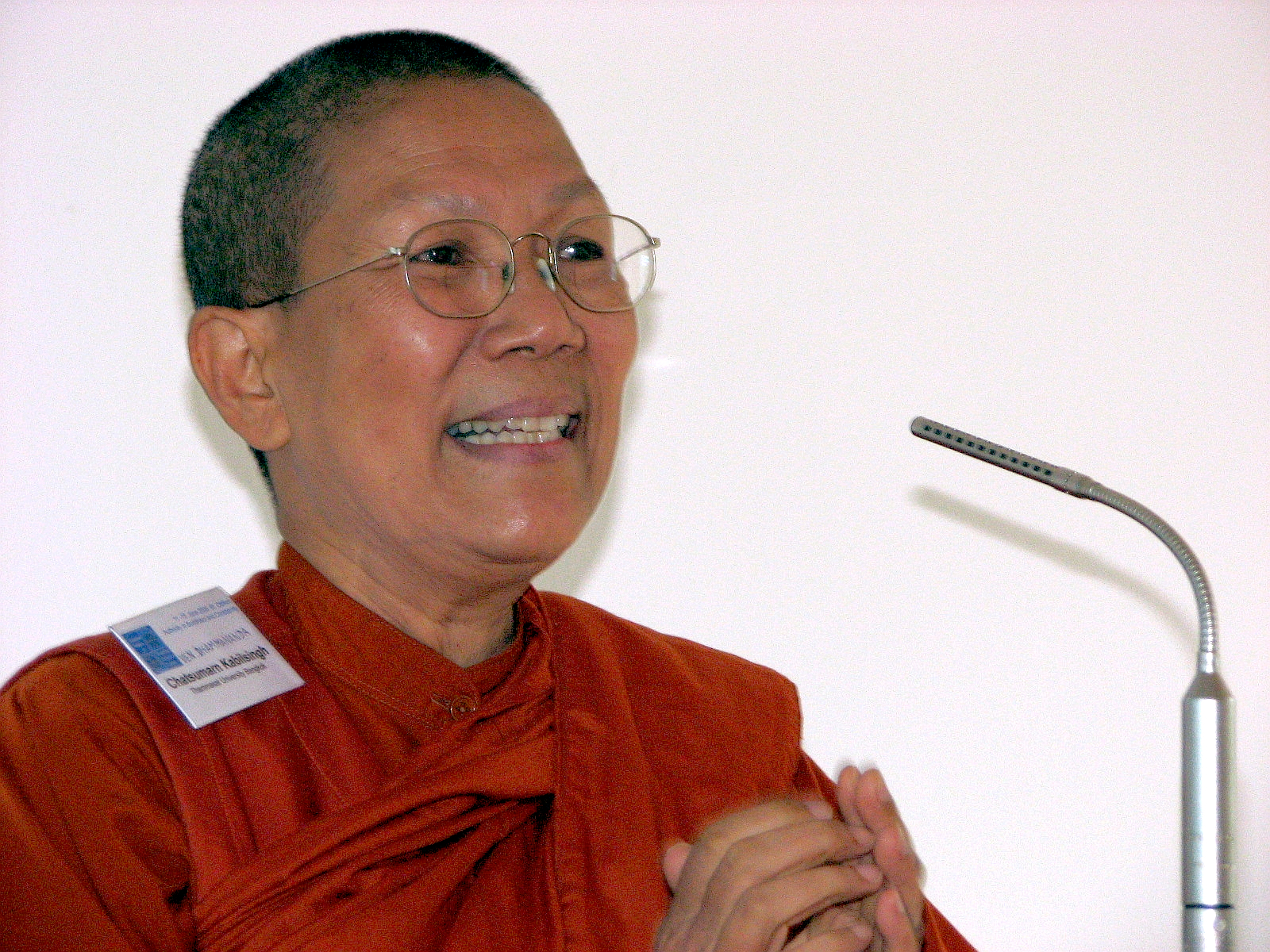
- Dhammananda Bhikkhuni 2020

Personal life
- Born: Chatsumarn Kabilsingh; 1944 (age 81–82)

Religious life
- Religion: Buddhism
- Monastic name: Songdhammakalyani Bhikkhuni Arama

Senior posting
- Present post: Abbess

Dhammananda Bhikkhuni (Thai: ธัมมนันทา, RTGS: Thammanantha), born Chatsumarn Kabilsingh (Thai: ฉัตรสุมาลย์ กบิลสิงห์) or Chatsumarn Kabilsingh Shatsena (Thai: ฉัตรสุมาลย์ กบิลสิงห์ ษัฏเสน; 1944), is a Thai bhikkhuni ("Buddhist nun"). On 28 February 2003, Kabilsingh received full monastic ordination as a bhikkhuni of the Theravada tradition in Sri Lanka. She is Abbess of Songdhammakalyani Monastery, the only temple in Thailand where there are bhikkhunis.

== Early life, education, and ordination ==
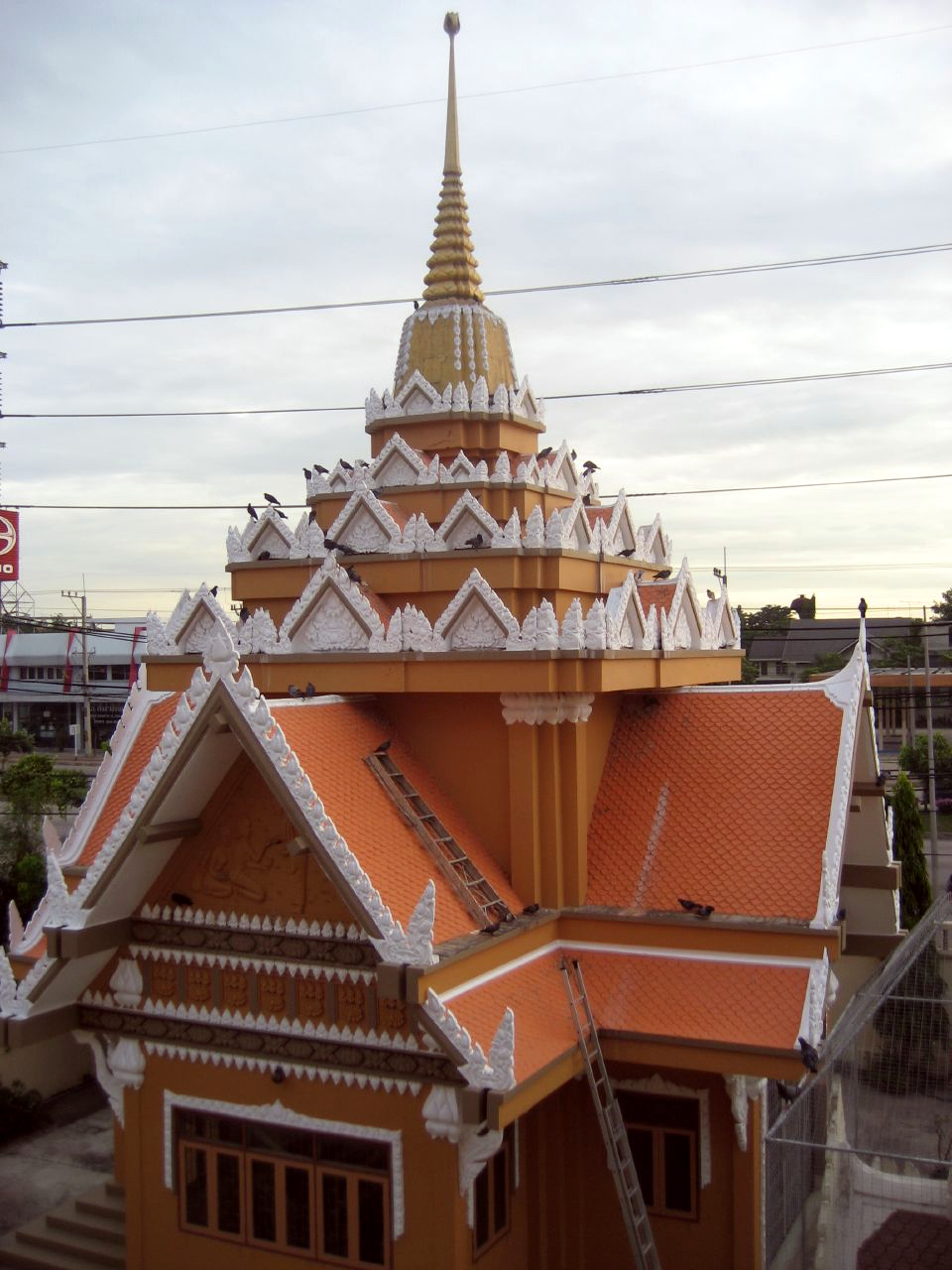
A new building in the Songdhammakalyani Monastery complex – the nunnery founded by her mother

Chatsumarn Kabilsingh was born in 1944 to Voramai Kabilsingh and Kokiat Shatsena. Her mother, Voramai, also called Ta Tao Fa Tzu (d. 2003), was ordained as bhikkhuni in a Dharmaguptaka lineage in Taiwan in 1971 – the first modern Thai bhikkhuni. Songdhammakalyani means "temple where women uphold the Dharma" and it is located in Nakhon Pathom near Bangkok.

Chatsumarn received Buddhist instruction and training along with the nuns. She says that her father, Kokiat, was "the first Thai man I knew who strongly supported the revival of the Bhikkhuni Sangha in Thailand." Unusual for Thai women, Chatsumarn received a higher education. After high school, she received her B.A. in Philosophy from Visva Bharati University, her M.A. in Religion from McMaster University in Canada, and her Ph.D. in Buddhism from Magadh University in India. She married, has three sons and six grandchildren. She taught for 27 years at Thammasat University in Bangkok, Thailand, in the Department of Philosophy and Religion. She is a well-known author of many books on contemporary issues in Asian Buddhism; many were published before her ordination and are under her birth name, Dr. Chatsumarn Kabilsingh.

She has often said that she knew she would become a monastic in the Buddhist tradition at some point in her life; she was just waiting for the right time. That time came in 2000 when she took early retirement from Thammasat University and received the Bodhisattva Precepts from the Fo Guang Shan order in Taiwan. In 2001, she took her sāmaṇerī ordination in Sri Lanka from R. Saddha Sumana Bhikkhuni and T. Dhammaloka Bhikkhu. In 2003, she was ordained a full bhikkhuni in Sri Lanka, the first Thai woman to be ordained in a Theravada monastic lineage, as Dhammananda. Her ordination lineage is Syamopali from Dambulla chapter. She currently resides at the Songdhammakalyani Monastery in the Muang District, Nakhonpathom province, Thailand. Since her ordination, Dhammananda has written more than 100 books, designed to educate the public about various issues related to Thai Buddhism, including the place of women.

== Other activities ==
Prior to her ordination, Dr. Kabilsingh wrote several books, including Thai Women in Buddhism (1991) which discusses the place of Thai Buddhist women in the context of Thai society, including those who choose to become maechi. Both as a layperson and a monastic, she has worked tirelessly to reestablish the Theravāda bhikkhuni lineage in Thailand so that women may become fully ordained monastics. She has encountered resistance from both laymen and monks in Thailand who believe female monastics are illegal and a corruption. Her work has caused some controversy in Thailand, although she receives much support from a growing number of Western Buddhist women.

In 1984, Kabilsingh started publishing Yasodhara: The Newsletter on International Buddhist Women's Activities, available in almost forty countries. Some articles from the Newsletter are available online. A few years later in 1991, Kabilsingh organized the first international conference of Buddhist women held in Bangkok, Thailand.

Dhammananda Bhikkhuni may be considered a Buddhist modernist writer, along with social activists and reformers such as Sulak Sivaraksa, A. T. Ariyaratne, Thích Nhất Hạnh, the 14th Dalai Lama, and Buddhadasa. There are several reasons for this designation. Most obvious is her work on the place of women in modern Asian Buddhism, especially the Theravāda tradition in Thailand. She writes/speaks about issues generally thought to constitute "socially Engaged Buddhism" such as Buddhism and nature/ecology/environmental issues, Buddhism and poverty, Feminism and Buddhism, prostitution (in Thailand), and Buddhism and education (lay and monastic).

While Dhammananda has a somewhat global approach as evidenced by founding an international newsletter or hosting an international conference, she has repeatedly stated that most problems in Thailand must be solved by the Thai people without the "help" of outsiders, including Western Buddhists. The solutions she offers are generally down-to-earth, concrete, and practical with an occasional hint of idealism shared by other Buddhist modernists. She makes clear acknowledgments about both the weaknesses and strengths of the current Thai Sangha; her writing advocates serious reform for monastic and lay Buddhists, not the least of which is the reestablishment of the Bhikkhuni order. Nantawan Boonprasat-Lewis comments "Kabilsingh thus advocates for the Sangha to be more involved in providing spiritual guidance to the laity and deal with their own fear of having women be equal to men. The social crisis, she says, is greater than this fear and needs the cooperation and involvement of all, regardless of gender, class, and ethnicity."

In 2014, Dhammananda Bhikkhuni was appointed as Pavattini by a Sri Lankan preceptor during a group ordination for women monks in Songkhla, Thailand.

== Recognition ==
She was recognised as one of the 100 Women (BBC) of 2019.

== Quotes ==
I do not choose to be ordained because I want people to recognise me. I did it because I want to carry on the heritage of the Lord Buddha. I am trying to revive the four pillars of Buddhism—bhikkus, bhikkhunis, laymen and laywomen—that will sustain the religion into the future. I don't mind if some people reserve different opinions about bhikkhunis. The public will be the ones to judge our worth.

I would be satisfied if I could serve as a refuge for women. I am not aiming at a big market. I don't think Thai women will rise up and get ordained en masse. A monastic path is not a comfortable lifestyle. I am thinking of a small religious community which helps women develop their own spirituality and contribute something to society.

I know there is some resistance out there. It is not my intention to stick out and provoke anybody. I will try to honour everyone. I will try to be a supatipanno, to be a female monk with good conduct. Time will tell. If society believes this is a worthy role, then people will support it and consider it another alternative for women.

== Commentary by others ==
I laud Chatsumarn Kabilsingh's efforts to educate her countrymen about both the history and the plight of Buddhist women in their own country. Her efforts to demonstrate to them that Buddhist teachings do not support their treatment of the Buddhist women in their midst is even more important. Perhaps they will listen to what a Buddhist woman from their own country, who is well educated in Buddhist thought, has to say about women in Buddhism. She cannot be dismissed as just another Westerner criticizing Asian culture.

— Rita M. Gross, foreword to Thai Women in Buddhism

Dr. Kabilsingh is a very devoted lady who wholeheartedly works for the good cause of women's liberation in a Buddhist manner.

— Sulak Sivaraksa

Like Ayya Khema in Sri Lanka, [Chatsumarn Kabilsingh] believes that Buddhist women should have the opportunity to fulfill their spiritual aspirations completely, and that is only possible if they can be ordained as bhikshuni. For it is the institution of the sangha that would provide women with real security and the opportunity to win the respect of the Thai laity. Dr. Kabilsingh does not foresee a sangha of bhikshuni who would devote their time exclusively to meditation, however, or to religious observances. Bhikshuni would be able to work to solve some of the country’s and the world’s horrendous social problems, with the force of the venerable sangha behind them... Bhikshuni in their own "nunneries", could educated girls and women (as Venerable Voramai Kabilsingh does at Watra Songdharma Kalyani) and help and counsel women with family or personal problems. Chatsumarn Kabilsingh, like her mother the Venerable Voramai and like the Venerable Ayya Khema in Sri Lanka, believes that bhikshuni should engage in social services and that they will want to.

— Christopher S. Queen, Engaged Buddhism in Asia
