= Songdhammakalyani Monastery =

Temple and monastery in Nakhon Pathom, Thailand

Coordinates: 13.8142°N 100.0927°E

Songkhammakalayani Monastery
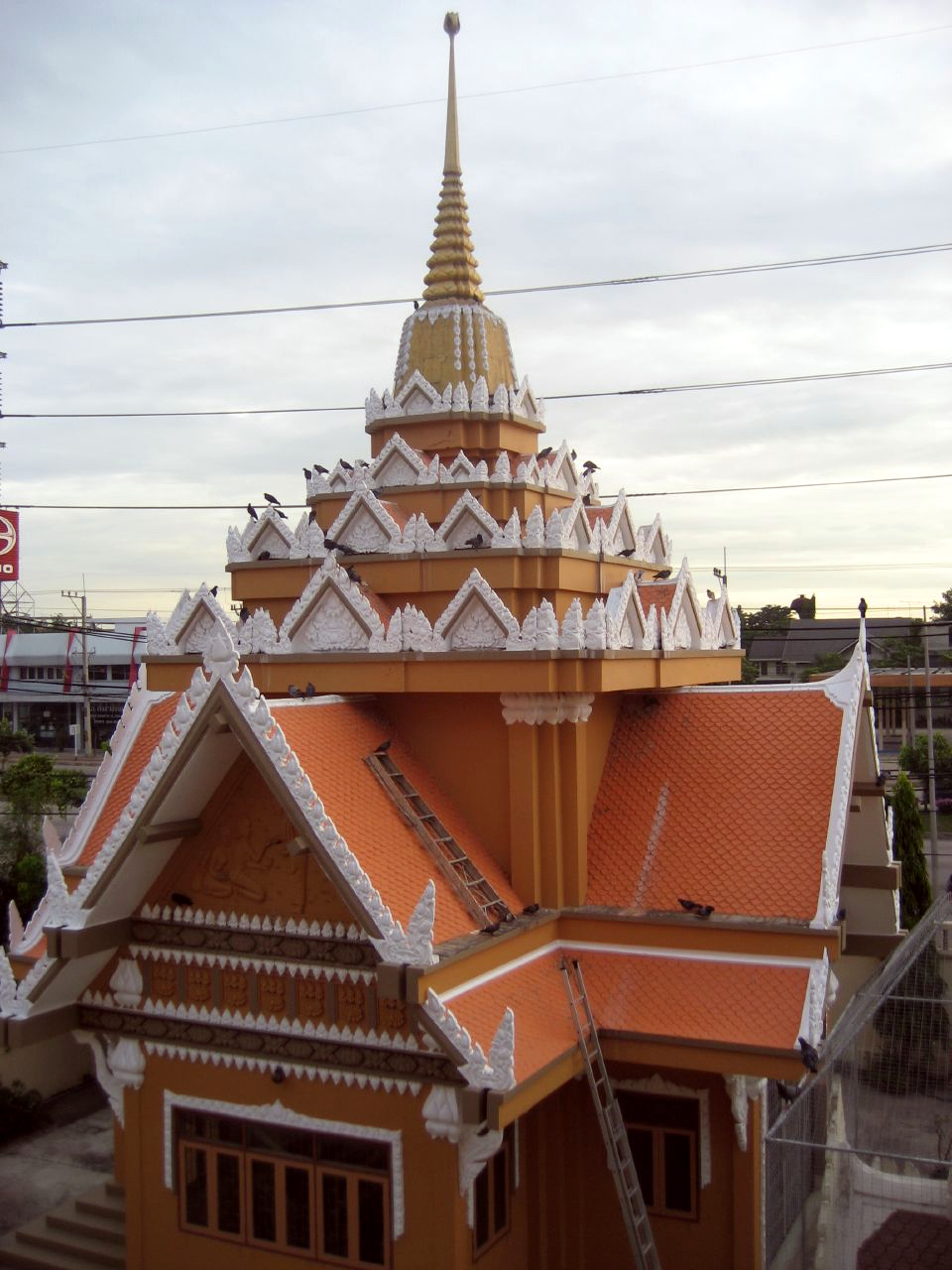
- A new building in the Wat Songkhammakalayani Temple complex

Religion
- Affiliation: Theravada Buddhism

Location
- Location: Nakhon Pathom
- Country: Thailand
- Interactive map of Songkhammakalayani Monastery

Architecture
- Founder: Ven. Bhikkhuni Ta Tao Fa Tzu
- Completed: 1960

Website
- http://www.songdhammakalyani.com/

Songdhammakalyani Monastery (Thai: ทรงธรรมกัลยาณีภิกษุณีอาราม; RTGS: Songthamkanlayani Phiksuni Aram) is a temple and monastery of Bhikkhuni in Nakhon Pathom, Thailand. It was founded in 1960 by Ven. Ta Tao Fa Tzu (born Voramai Kabilsingh), the first modern Thai woman to ordain as a bhikkhuni. The monastery was originally known as Wat Songdhammakalyani (the temple of women who uphold Dharma)."

Songdhammakalyani Monastery was founded by Voramai Kabilsingh, who became interested in Buddhism and meditation in 1954 after a meeting with Luang Pu Sodh, at Wat Paknam in Bangkok. In 1956, Voramai took the lower ordination, wearing yellow robes to distinguish herself from mae chi or bhikkhu, and developed a following of other yellow robed women. In 1957, she purchased land in Nakhon Pathom to build Songdhammakalyani Monastery for women, which became a full temple in 1960. The monastery was the first Buddhist monastery in Thailand established by and for women, and operated a primary school for orphans, a printing press for Buddhist publications and provided social services for the poor. Voramai took higher ordination as a full bhikkhuni in a Dharmaguptaka lineage in Taiwan in 1971 with the monastic name Ta Tao Fa Tzu. In 2001, Voramai's daughter took ordination as a samaneri, or female novice monk, and in 2003, she received full ordination in Sri Lanka, which recently reestablished the bhikkhuni order, and became known as Dhammananda Bhikkhuni. Dhammananda Bhikkhuni was the first modern Thai women to be ordained as a bhikkhuni in the Theravada lineage, resulting in Songdhammakalyani Monastery becoming the first and only monastery in Thailand for modern Theravada bhikkhuni. Dhammananda Bhikkhuni eventually became the abbess of the monastery.

Varanggana Vanavichayen, the first female monk ordained in Thailand, was ordained in Songdhammakalyani Monastery in 2002.
