= Come and See (2019 film) =

- Directed by: Nottapon Boonprakob
- Production company: underDOC Film
- Release date: October 2019
- Running time: 84 minutes
- Country: Thailand
- Language: Thai

Come and See (Thai: เอหิปัสสิโก; RTGS: ehipatsiko) is a Thai documentary film directed by Nottapon Boonprakob and produced by UnderDoc Film. The film focuses on the alleged controversies regarding the teachings and practices of Wat Phra Dhammakaya and chronicles the events of the 23-day lockdown of the temple by the Thai military junta in 2017. The film was initially screened at the Busan International Film Festival in South Korea in 2019 before being released in Thailand in April 2021 following approval by Thai media censors.

The film's original Thai language name, Ehipassiko, comes from a phrase commonly used in a Pali language Theravada Buddhist chant, meaning literally "come and see", hence the name.

== Production ==
The film was initially produced by Nottapon Boonprakob as his thesis at the School of Visual Arts in New York City. The film focused on the alleged controversies surrounding Wat Phra Dhammakaya's teachings and practices, and highlighted the conflict and lawsuits between Wat Phra Dhammakaya and Thailand's 2014 military junta, which put the temple under intense scrutiny in the Thai media for a period and resulted in a 23-day lockdown and siege of the temple in 2017 by the military junta.

The 84-minute film included extensive interviews with both supporters and critics of Wat Phra Dhammakaya regarding its teachings and practices, and included footage shot in real time during the siege in 2017. The film includes interviews with well known Dhammakaya critics such as Thai Senator Paiboon Nititawan and former monk Mano Laohavanich; as well as Thai Buddhist academics such as Phra Paisal Visalo and Nidhi Eoseewong.

== Release ==
=== Cinema ===
The film was selected to be screened at the 24th Busan International Film Festival in 2019 but was banned in Thailand by Thai media censors. Thai Film Archive screened the film once in 2020. The ban on the film was lifted after two years, with the film premiering in Thai cinemas in April 2021. Boonprakob expressed surprise for the film's approval by the Thai Censorship Board. News analysts described the film's approval as a possible attempt by Thailand's military-backed government to moderate its image in the wake of the 2020–2021 Thai Protests.

=== Home media ===
The film became available on Thai Netflix in August 2021.

=== Reception ===
The film received critical acclaim as a type of long-form journalism that presented a wide range of views and provided a unique investigation into the temple and its alleged controversies that provided insight and perspectives about Wat Phra Dhammakaya that could not be found in mainstream media reports.

=== Accolades ===
Year	Award	Category	Recipient	Result
2022	18th Kom Chad Luek Awards	Best Thai Film	Come and See	Won
2022	18th Kom Chad Luek Awards	Best Director	Nottapon Boonprakob	Nominated
2022	30th Entertainment Critics Club Awards	Best Film	Come and See	Won
2022	30th Entertainment Critics Club Awards	Best Director	Nottapon Boonprakob	Nominated
2022	30th Entertainment Critics Club Awards	Best Director	Come and See	Nominated
2022	30th Entertainment Critics Club Awards	Best Film Sequence	Come and See	Won
2022	30th Entertainment Critics Club Awards	Best Original Music	Come and See	Nominated
