= Wat Phra Dhammakaya =

Thai Buddhist temple

- วัดพระธรรมกาย
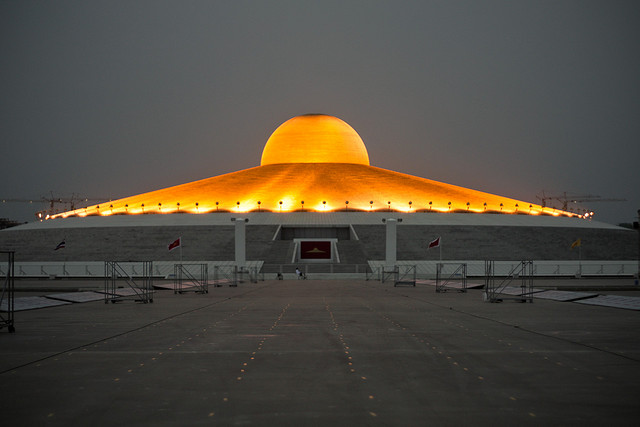
- The Dhammakaya Cetiya
- Interactive map of Wat Phra Dhammakaya

Monastery information
- Order: Dhammakaya, Theravāda
- Established: 1970; 56 years ago

People
- Founder: Luang Por Dhammajayo Chandra Khonnokyoong
- Abbot: Luang Por Dhammajayo (honorary) Phra Khru Palat Rattanawirawat (Rangsarit Itthijintako) (official abbot) Luang Por Dattajīvo (deputy abbot and de facto caretaker)
- Important associated figures: Luang Pu Sodh Candasaro

Site
- Location: Pathum Thani, Thailand
- Coordinates: 14°04′09″N 100°38′51″E
- Website: en.dhammakaya.net

Wat Phra Dhammakaya (Thai: วัดพระธรรมกาย, RTGS: Wat Phra Thammakai, pronounced [wát pʰráʔ tʰām.mā.kāːj]) is a Buddhist temple (wat) in Khlong Luang district, in the Pathum Thani province north of Bangkok, Thailand. It was founded in 1970 by the maechi (nun) Chandra Khonnokyoong and Luang Por Dhammajayo. It is the best-known and the fastest growing temple of the Dhammakaya tradition. This tradition, teaching Dhammakaya meditation (Vijja Dhammakaya), was started by the meditation master Luang Pu Sodh Candasaro in the early 20th century. Wat Phra Dhammakaya is one of the temples that emerged from this tradition and is part of the Mahā Nikāya fraternity. The temple is legally represented by the Dhammakaya Foundation. It aims to adapt traditional Buddhist values in modern society, doing so through modern technology and marketing methods. The temple has faced controversy and a government crackdown. Wat Phra Dhammakaya plays a leading role in Thai Buddhism, with theologian Edward Irons describing it as "the face of modern Thai Buddhism".

Initially, the temple was founded as a meditation center, after Maechi Chandra and the just ordained monk Luang Por Dhammajayo could no longer accommodate the rising number of participants in activities at Wat Paknam Bhasicharoen. The center became an official temple in 1977. The temple grew exponentially during the 1980s, when the temple's programs became widely known among the urban middle class. Wat Phra Dhammakaya expanded its area and the building of a huge stupa (pagoda) was started. During the 1997 Asian financial crisis, the temple was subject to widespread criticism for its fundraising methods and teachings. Luang Por Dhammajayo had several charges laid against him and was removed from his office as abbot. In 2006, the charges were withdrawn and he was restored as abbot. The temple grew further and became known for its many projects in education, promotion of ethics, and scholarship. The temple also became accepted as part of the mainstream Thai Saṅgha (monastic community).

During the rule of Thailand's 2014 military junta, the abbot and the temple were put under scrutiny again and Luang Por Dhammajayo was accused of receiving stolen money from a supporter and money-laundering in a case generally seen as a politically motivated conflict between the Dhammayuttika Nikāya and Mahā Nikāya as well as between the Red Shirt movement and the Thai junta. The temple has been referred to as the only influential organization in Thailand not to be subdued by the military junta, a rare sight for a ruling junta that shut down most opposition after taking power. The judicial processes against the abbot and the temple since the 1990s have led to much debate regarding the procedures and role of the state towards religion, a debate that has intensified during the 2017 lockdown of the temple by the junta. As of 2017, the whereabouts of Luang Por Dhammajayo was still unknown, and in 2018, Phrakhru Sangharak Rangsarit Itthijintako was designated as the official abbot.

Wat Phra Dhammakaya emphasizes a culture of making merit through doing good deeds and meditation, as well as an ethical outlook on life. The temple promotes a community of kalyāṇamittas ('good friends') to achieve its vision. In its beginnings, the temple emphasized mostly the teaching of meditation, then later emphasized fundraising more. Finally, the temple broadened its activities to include more engagement in society. The temple uses a satellite television station and a distance-learning university. In its large temple complex, the temple houses several monuments and memorials, and in its construction designs traditional Buddhist concepts are given modern forms. The temple aims to become a global spiritual center to help cultivate its slogan "World Peace through Inner Peace". As of 2017, the number of followers was estimated at three million people worldwide.

== History ==
=== Early history (1963–1996) ===
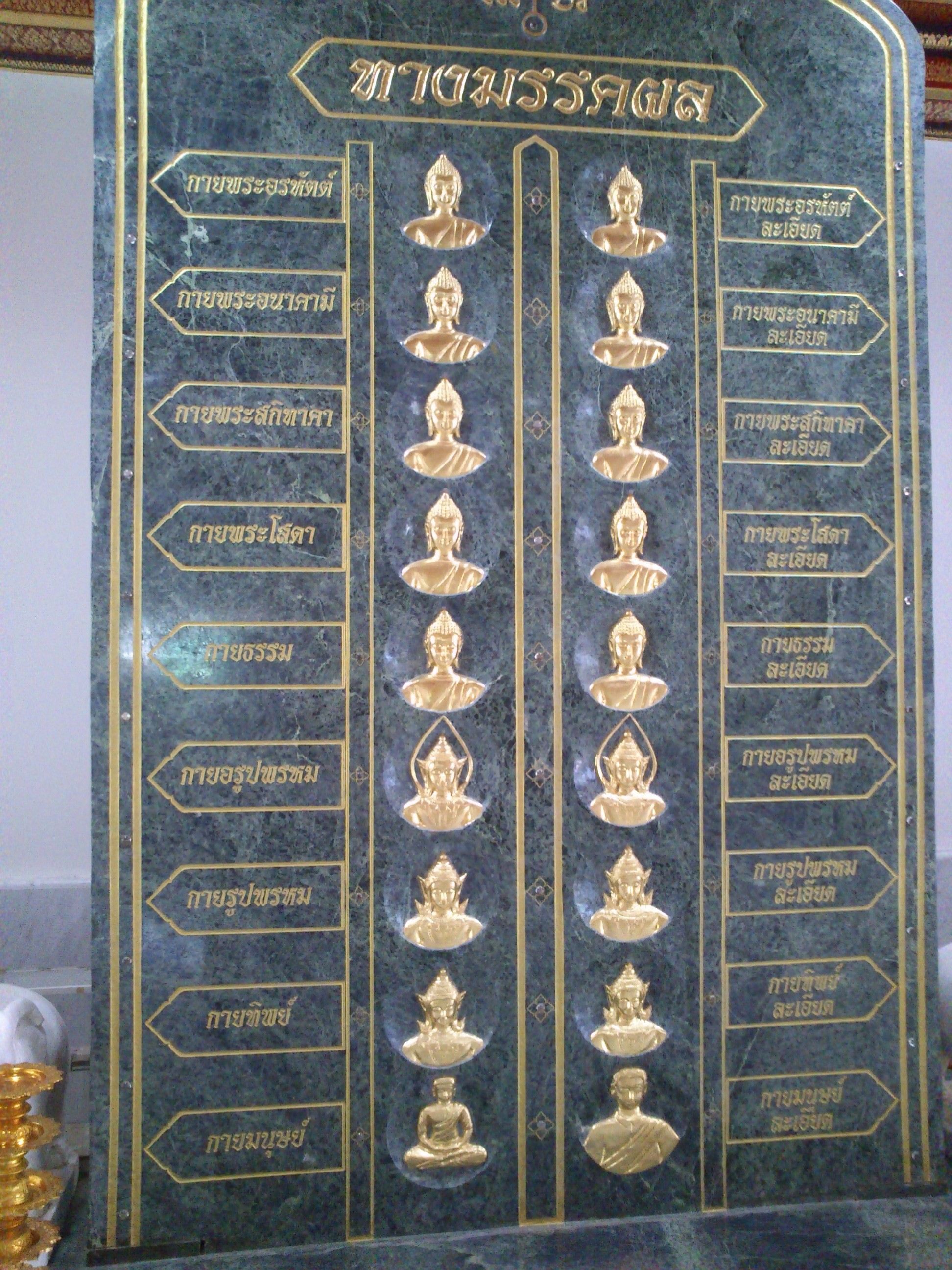
Luang Pu Sodh usually explained the process of attainment in the Dhammakaya meditation method in terms of inner bodies (Pali: kaya), existing within every human being.

After the meditation teacher Luang Pu Sodh died in 1959, the maechi (nun) Chandra Koonnokyoong transmitted the Dhammakaya tradition to a new generation at Wat Paknam Bhasicharoen. Chaiyabun Sutthiphon, a university student at Kasetsart University, started visiting her at Wat Paknam in 1963. As the community grew, Chaiyabun was ordained as a monk in 1969 and received the name Phra Dhammajayo. Eventually Wat Paknam was unable to accommodate all of the students interested in learning meditation.

Thus, on 20 February 1970, Maechi Chandra, Phra Dhammajayo, and his former senior student Phadet Pongsawat moved to the 196-rai (313,600 m^{2} or 77.5-acre) plot of land to found a new meditation center. Although initially they intended to buy a plot of land, the landowner gave a plot four times the requested size to practice generosity on the occasion of her birthday. Phra Dhammajayo later became abbot of the temple and was called Luang Por Dhammajayo from then on, and Pongsawat was ordained with the name Luang Por Dattajīvo and became deputy abbot. In 1972, the center started a program called Dhammadayada ('heirs of the Dhamma'), a meditation training program focused on university students. Due to the temple's early activities having a large number of students joining and students in the 1970s tending to be leftist, for a brief period Wat Phra Dhammakaya was accused of supporting the Communist insurgency in Thailand.

Although originally intended as a satellite meditation center of Wat Paknam, the center eventually became an official temple in 1977. The temple was originally called "Wat Voranee Dhammakayaram", but was renamed "Wat Phra Dhammakaya" in 1982. Wat Phra Dhammakaya gained great popularity during the 1980s (during the Asian economic boom). The temple emphasized values of prosperity, modernity and personal development, which made it attractive for the middle class, especially during times of quick cultural and social changes. During this period the temple became more involved in social activities, such as promoting blood donations, and began organized Buddhist training programs for both the private and public sector. By the mid-1980s, the temple was attracting up to fifty thousand people on major ceremonies.

Wat Phra Dhammakaya started expanding the temple grounds significantly starting in 1984. In the 1980s and 1990s the temple became known for promoting Buddhist education and scholarship and also began building up relationships with Buddhist organizations outside of Thailand, with Wat Phra Dhammakaya and Fo Guang Shan in Taiwan declaring each other sister temples in 1994. In 1992, the temple started to found its first branch centers, in the United States, Japan and Taiwan.

=== First clash with government (1997–2000) ===
In the wake of the 1997 Asian financial crisis the temple came under heavy criticism following the miracle controversy, when the temple claimed that a miracle was witnessed at their meditation event where the sun disappeared and a golden statue or a crystal appeared in the sky. It also reported miraculous occurrences in the lives of its supporters. Wat Phra Dhammakaya was also seen to have right-wing sympathies for its links to some government and military officials. The main criticism was that the temple was using fundraising methods that did not fit in with Buddhism and the temple had become too capitalistic. Although many of these methods and teachings were not unique to Wat Phra Dhammakaya, the criticism came at a moment when the temple had become very noticeable due to its size, its high-profile supporters, and due to the project of building the Dhammakaya Cetiya at the time, which required a lot of funds. All of this occurred against the backdrop of the financial crisis Thailand was facing at the time.

Prompted by the criticism and public outcry, in January 1999 the Saṅgha Supreme Council started an investigation into the temple, led by Luang Por Ñāṇavaro, Chief of the Greater Bangkok Region. (Note: Then known by the title "Phraprommolee".) One of the accusations Luang Por Ñāṇavaro investigated was that Luang Por Dhammajayo had moved land donated to the temple to his own name. The temple denied this, stating that it was the donors' intention to give the land to the abbot, and not the temple, and that this was common and legal in Thailand. Eventually the Saṅgha Council declared that Wat Phra Dhammakaya and Luang Por Dhammajayo had not committed any serious offenses against monastic discipline (Vinaya) that were cause for defrocking (removal from monkhood) but instead practical directives were given for the temple to improve itself. Despite this, the Religious Affairs Department, the secular part of the government in charge, charged Luang Por Dhammajayo with alleged embezzlement and removed him from his post as abbot.

Luang Por Dhammajayo was summoned by prosecutors to acknowledge the charges but the temple asked for a guarantee that the abbot would not be imprisoned and consequently defrocked. (Note: In Thai law monks cannot be jailed, therefore, if a monk is jailed before trial, he is forced to disrobe even before guilt is determined. Disrobing effectively strips a Buddhist monk from his status and position within the monastic community, and is therefore considered by serious practitioners tantamount to execution.) No such guarantee was given, an arrest warrant followed, and a standoff began between police and the temple's practitioners. After two days, Luang Por Dhammajayo agreed to let the police take him when the requested guarantee was given. The abbot was interrogated but not defrocked, and was released. Luang Por Dhammajayo later fell ill and was hospitalized with throat and lung infections. The Ministry of Education also accused Luang Por Dhammajayo of having stated that the Tipiṭaka (Buddhist scriptures) was incomplete. Although there was no law in Thailand against this, he was eventually charged with this as well. During this period, many news reporters used pejorative language in describing the Saṅgha Council, the Supreme Patriarch, or Wat Phra Dhammakaya. This period of intense media attention had effects on the temple's fundraising, but the temple continued to organize projects, ceremonies and other events. The trials proceeded slowly, as the hearings were postponed because of evidence that was not ready, and because of the abbot's illness.

In 2000, Maechi Chandra Khonnokyoong died.

=== Nationwide engagement (2001–2013) ===
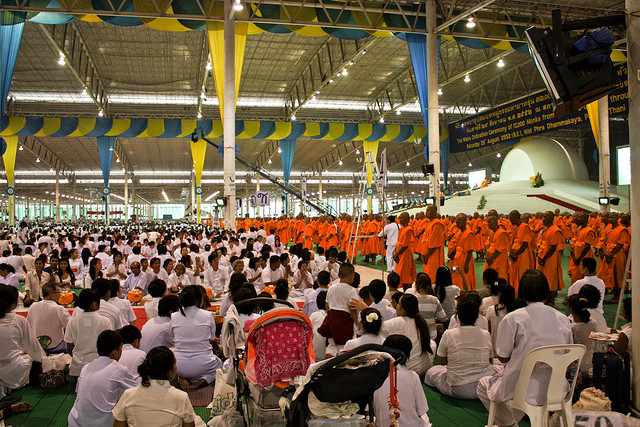
Ordination ceremony for new monks at Wat Phra Dhammakaya

In the 2000s, the Thai media gradually lost interest in the temple's controversies from the Asian financial crisis. During this period, the temple began to focus more on promoting an ethical lifestyle, using the five and eight precepts as a foundation. The campaign had a national impact when the temple started organizing protests against the company Thai Beverage's public listing in the Stock Exchange of Thailand. The company, a producer of alcoholic beverages, finally had to capitulate and decided to list in Singapore instead.

The temple broadened its activities to a more national scope. The temple started its own satellite channel called Dhammakaya Media Channel (DMC), to broadcast live events to branch centers. and a university that supports distance learning. The temple started to use this satellite channel to broadcast live events to branch centers, such as guided meditations. Wat Phra Dhammakaya started to develop a more international approach to its teachings, teaching meditation in non-Buddhist countries as a religiously neutral technique suitable for those of all faiths, or none. An international Dhammadayada training program was also started, held in Chinese and English, and the temple started to organize retreats in English language in Thailand and abroad. Later on, guided meditations were also held online, in different languages. According to anthropologist Jim Taylor, Wat Phra Dhammakaya was the first new religious organization in Thailand to effectively use Internet technology in disseminating its teachings.

In 2006 the Attorney-General withdrew the charges against Luang Por Dhammajayo, stating that there was insufficient reason to pursue the case any further. He stated that Luang Por Dhammajayo had moved all the land to the name of the temple and that he had corrected his teachings as directed. Luang Por Dhammajayo's position as an abbot was subsequently restored.

From 2008 onward, the temple extended its youth activities to include a training course in Buddhist practice known as V-star, and a yearly national day of Buddhist activities. One year later, Wat Phra Dhammakaya expanded its temporary ordination program by making it nationwide. In this program, the participants were trained in thousands of temples spread over Thailand, but ordained simultaneously at Wat Phra Dhammakaya. As part of the ordination programs, the temple started to organize pilgrimages passing important places in the life of Luang Pu Sodh. The pilgrimages stirred up resentment however, because it was very noticeable, allegedly caused traffic jams, and a debate started as to whether it was going against tradition. Eventually, the temple stopped the pilgrimages. Also during this period, Wat Phra Dhammakaya started to invest more resources in its own education and scholarship, continuously ranking as one of the five highest in the country in Pāli studies. Despite differing opinions about the work of the temple, as of 2010, Wat Phra Dhammakaya was the fastest growing temple in Thailand and major ceremonies were reaching attendance of 300,000 people.

=== Standoff with junta (2014–present) ===
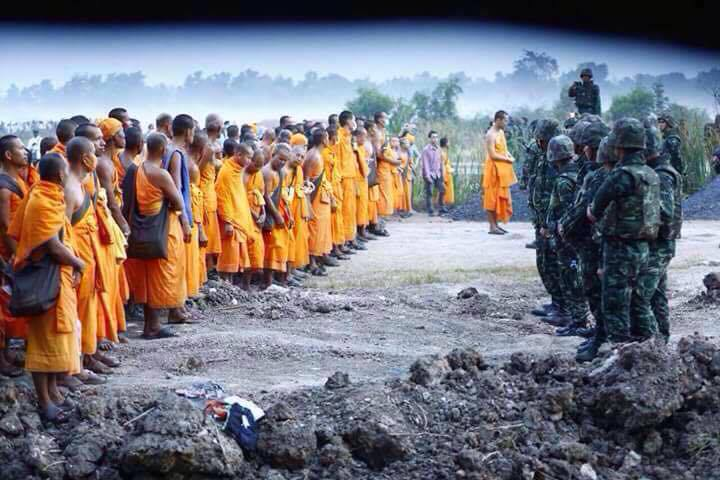
The Klongchan controversy led to a 23-day lockdown of the temple in 2017 by the junta using Article 44 of the interim constitution.

The temple came under heavy scrutiny again after the 2014 coup d'état. Following the coup, the new military junta set up a National Reform Council, with a religious committee seeking to make several changes in the Thai Saṅgha. These changes were led by former senator Paiboon Nititawan, monk and former infantryman, then a monk and former infantryman Phra Buddha Issara, and former Wat Phra Dhammakaya monk Mano Laohavanich. Senator Paiboon led a failed attempt to reopen the 1999 case of Luang Por Dhammajayo's alleged land embezzlement. Phra Suwit objected to the nomination of Somdet Chuang Varapuñño, the monk who ordained Luang Por Dhammajayo, as the next Supreme Patriarch of Thailand, and successfully held a petition to stop it. Meanwhile, Mano Laohavanich began appearing extensively in Thai media criticizing Wat Phra Dhammakaya, former Thai Rak Thai party members, and various groups the junta was generally seen as opposed to.

In 2015 the temple was implicated in the Klongchan Credit Union controversy when 11.37 billion baht was taken out by an employee of the Klongchan Credit Union Cooperative (KCUC) via unauthorized checks, of which a portion totaling more than a billion baht was found to have been given to Wat Phra Dhammakaya via donations. Spokespeople of Wat Phra Dhammakaya said that Luang Por Dhammajayo was not aware that the donations were illegally obtained. Despite an agreement between the temple and the credit union about giving back money, which had settled the situation, Luang Por Dhammajayo was summoned to acknowledge the charges of ill-gotten gains and conspiring to money-laundering at the offices of the DSI. The temple requested the DSI to let him acknowledge his charges at the temple due to his deep vein thrombosis, a request the DSI refused. When Luang Por Dhammajayo did not appear at the DSI office to acknowledge his charges, authorities launched several failed raids of the temple to search for the honorary abbot and laid hundreds of additional charges on the temple. The standoff has been described as the only major demonstration against the junta since the coup, a rare sight for a ruling junta that has silenced most opposition since seizing power.

The Klongchan controversy led to a 23-day lockdown of the temple in 2017 by the junta using Article 44 of the interim constitution. A debate about the role of the state toward religion intensified during this time, as well as criticism of the junta's handling of the case. Despite the lockdown, authorities came out empty-handed. As of 20 December 2017, Thai authorities had still not found Luang Por Dhammajayo. Regardless, in the aftermath of the lockdown the junta's lawsuits against the temple continued.

In December 2017, the temple assigned Phrakhru Sangharak Rangsarit Itthijintako as the temple's new abbot and began announcing the organization of new events. News outlet Kom Chad Luek described this as a "revival" of the temple, but news outlet Thai PBS stated that the temple had not been affected much by the disappearance of the former abbot. As of 2017, the number of followers was estimated at 3 million people.

== Political analysis ==
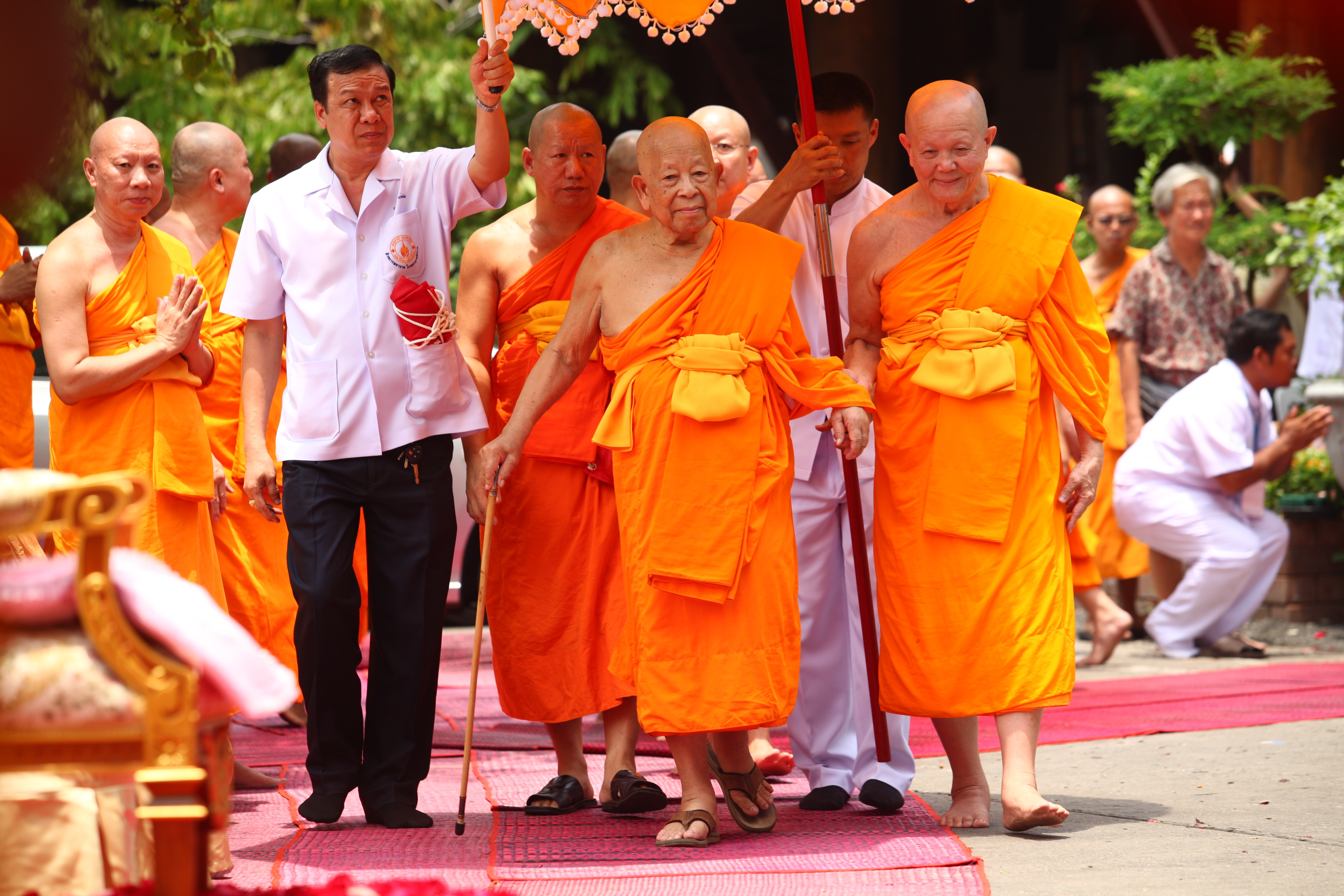
Somdet Chuang Varapuñño and Luang Por Dattajīvo

The junta's actions toward the temple have been the subject of much debate and speculation among news analysts. Since the junta's crackdown of the temple the question has been raised as to why the state is so strongly opposed to the temple, with many doubting the extensive efforts as a mere attempt to "enforce the law". It has been pointed out that the problems with Wat Phra Dhammakaya formed a distraction for the media from the more serious problems politicians had to deal with, both in 1999 and during the Klongchan controversy.

Several political commentators have stated that the actions of the Thai junta towards the temple may have reflected a political need to control who should be selected as the next Supreme Patriarch. The monk who was next in line for the position, Somdet Chuang Varapuñño, had ordained Luang Por Dhammajayo. (Note: Prior to the change in law in December 2016, the Supreme Patriarch was chosen from whoever was the most senior member of the Saṅgha Supreme Council, who, at the time, was Somdet Chuang.) Selecting Somdet Chuang would have meant a Supreme Patriarch from the Mahā Nikāya fraternity, rather than the Dhammayuttika fraternity, which historically had been the preferred choice by the Thai government and the monarchy. In fact, Somdet Chuang had already been nominated by the Saṅgha Supreme Council, but the appointment was postponed and eventually withdrawn by the Thai Junta, with another candidate from the Dhammayuttika fraternity having been appointed instead. The several hundred coinciding lawsuits against Wat Phra Dhammakaya and Somdet Chuang's connection to the temple were, in fact, eventually used as a reason by the junta to withdraw his nomination.

In addition, since the period that Prime Minister Thaksin Shinawatra was still in power, Wat Phra Dhammakaya had been associated with Thaksin, and subsequently, his Red Shirt pressure group which opposes the ruling junta. (Note: During the period of PM Thaksin, the increased liberalization of Buddhism had benefited mostly the Mahā Nikāya fraternity and therefore Wat Phra Dhammakaya.) When Thaksin Shinawatra was in power, the temple was often accused of having close ties to him, influencing his policies and eventually causing him to stop the lawsuits against the temple. The temple and Red Shirt leaders have denied any political relationship. Scholars and political commentators have not been in agreement as to whether the temple was related to PM Thaksin and the Red Shirts political group, and if so, to what extent. Some major supporters of the temple were also publicly known to be members of the Yellow Shirts political group, PM Thaksin's political opposition.

One spokesperson of the temple pointed out that the temple is often seen as a threat during periods of political tension. Indeed, the temple has often been described as the only influential organization in Thailand that has not been subdued by the ruling junta since the 2014 coup d'état. But more material motivations may also have been involved. Critics and scholars have speculated that the junta may be trying to seize the temple and confiscate its famed wealth. In listing the reasons why the junta is opposed to the temple, anthropologist Jim Taylor also notes that the temple has not donated much to the palace.

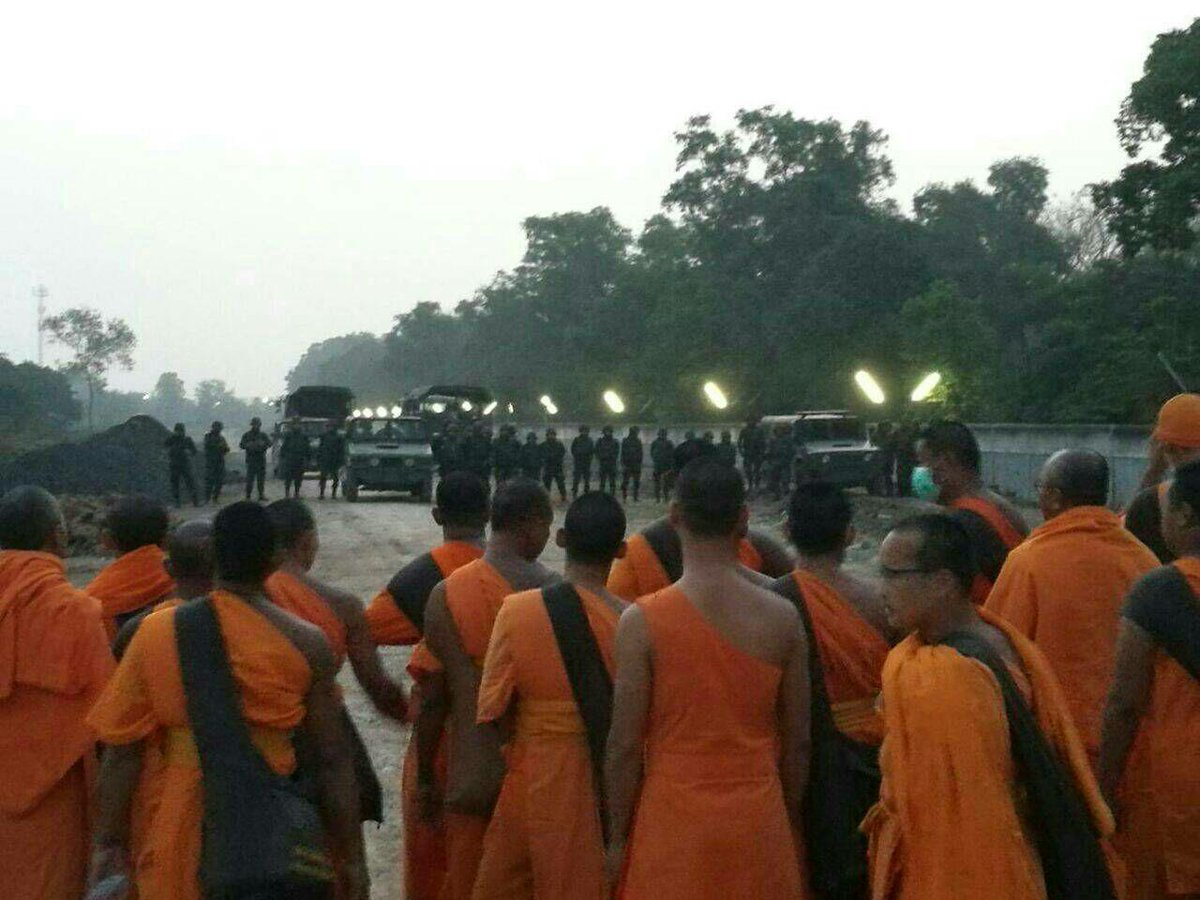
Junta forces surround Wat Phra Dhammakaya

Protesters drew comparisons between Somdet Chuang's postponed appointment, and that of Phra Phimontham, a leading monk charged with communist insurgency during the Cold War. The latter was jailed and defrocked, but was later determined to have been innocent all along. Proponents of Wat Phra Dhammakaya referred to Phra Phimontham's case to explain why Luang Por Dhammajayo did not go to acknowledge the charges in 1999, and again in 2016. After Phra Phimontham was released, he entered the monkhood again without re-ordaining, since he never had disrobed officially and voluntarily anyway. Some critics have suggested that Luang Por Dhammajayo should do the same, but other commentators have argued that indictment under the current military junta would be even more dangerous than that of the junta at the time of Phra Phimontham, with no Thai law prohibiting torture of prisoners.

Despite its many opponents, Wat Phra Dhammakaya is generally seen by pro-democracy Thai intellectuals as a symbol of religious pluralism that has managed to survive. Political scientist Duncan McCargo and other western scholars have posed the question of why conservative Thai scholars have not considered the freedom of religion argument in the case of Wat Phra Dhammakaya. Several Thai scholars have pointed out the increasing entanglement of state and religion in Thailand, as the temple has relied heavily on the Supreme Saṅgha Council's authority in its activities. Since the Saṅgha Council is part of the Thai government, critics are afraid the influential temple might take over the state. If state and religion were more separated, problems could be more easily solved by the Saṅgha and other parts of civil society, without any state interference.

== Principles, practices and beliefs ==
=== General ===
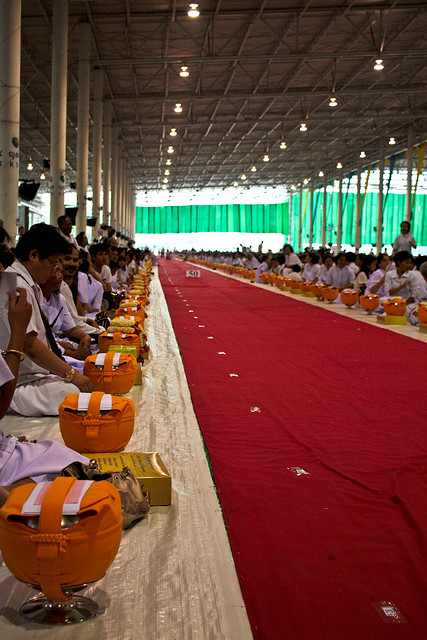
Ceremony at Wat Phra Dhammakaya

Wat Phra Dhammakaya sees itself teaching traditional values and "purified Buddhism" that "cleans up its nation's moral life". These teachings include meditation and selected forms of merit-accumulation. Its leaders see themselves as "heading a key Buddhist reform movement" to improve the lives of its followers, strengthen Buddhism and bring prosperity to Thailand. Wat Phra Dhammakaya deploys modern media, advertisements for merit making and fundraising, internet, and other modern technologies to achieve these goals. Its methods along with modernist interpretations of Theravāda Buddhist doctrines have been a source of controversy. It has been called by some scholars "a Buddhist prosperity movement with some millenarian and fundamentalist characteristics", and compared to Taiwanese new religious movements. Yet, the temple does not quite resonate with the "fundamentalistic" classification, states theologian Rory Mackenzie. The term can be misleading because of the temple's size, commitment to meditation and its progressive nature.

Wat Phra Dhammakaya notably focuses on the Dhammakaya meditation method and its modern teaching practices make it stand out from mainstream Thai Buddhism, though it is not defiant of it. The temple has put in great efforts to remain part of the main Mahā Nikāya fraternity and makes it a point to often demonstrate their loyalty, and offer support to the Thai royal family and the leading monks of the Thai Saṅgha. The combination of the traditional and the modern can also be found in the temple's teachings, in which intellectual Buddhism and Thai folk religion meet. The temple is a typical example of Buddhism for the Thai middle class, which emphasizes practical solutions for the individual and society. The temple is, however, more spiritual than intellectual in its influence on devotees, and in its attempts to exercise political influence it is more indirect than most other forms of middle class Buddhism.

Wat Phra Dhammakaya attaches great importance to its lineage of teachers, starting from Luang Pu Sodh Candasaro, who then passed on his experience to Maechi Chandra Khonnokyoong, who in her turn passed it on to Luang Por Dhammajayo. In the PR and media of the temple the teachers are much emphasized as an inseparable part of the temple's tradition, from which the temple gains its authenticity.

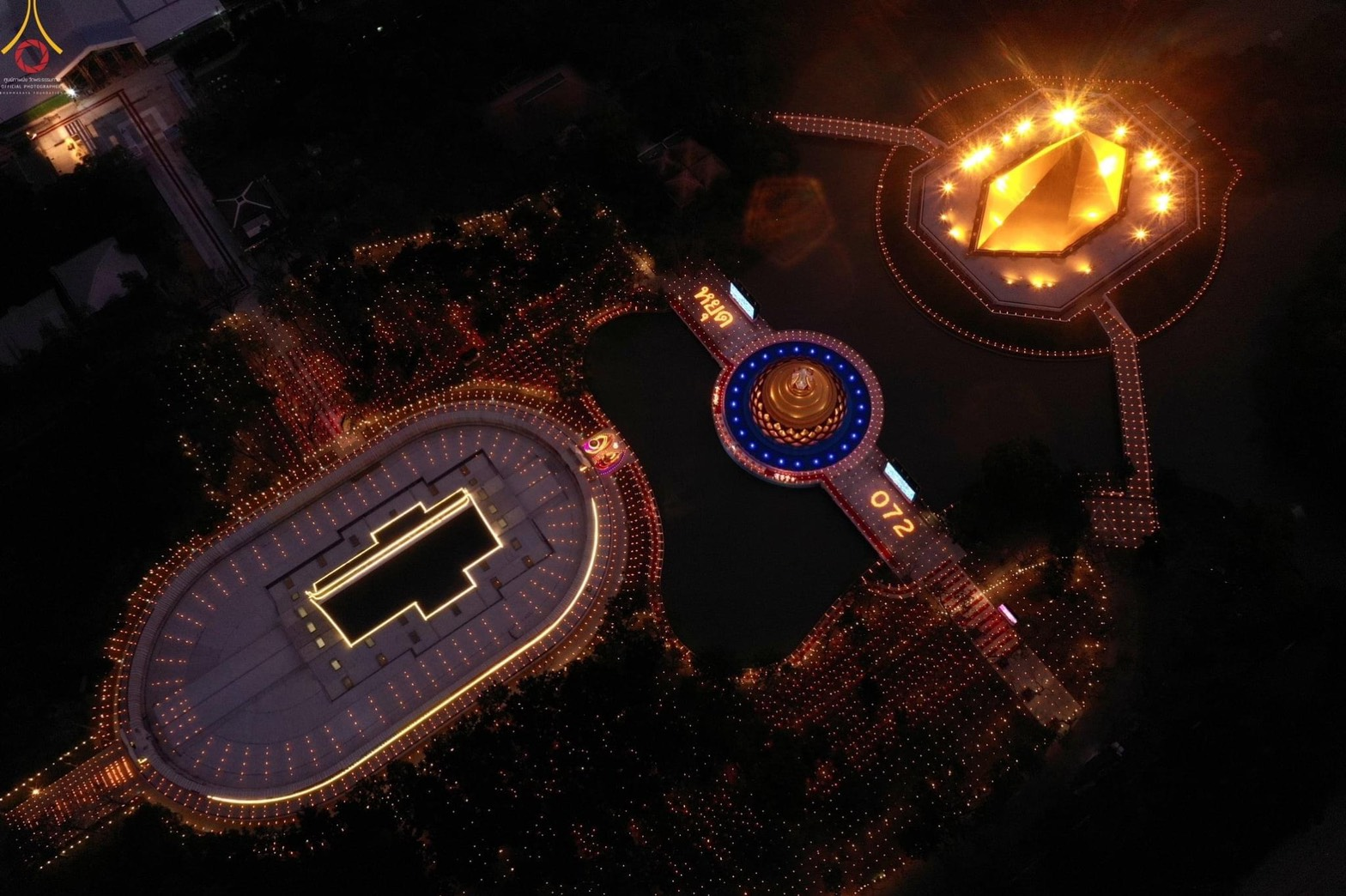
Aerial view of Wat Phra Dhammakaya at night

Wat Phra Dhammakaya attempts to revive the local temple's role as a spiritual community center, but does so within a format that is meant to fit with modern society and customs. According to the temple's active propagation philosophy, in the present day and age people will not come to the Buddhist temple anymore, because the temple is no longer the center of community life. The temple therefore must seek out its devotees in society in an active way, so as to promote virtue both in the temple and at home and school. In this active propagation philosophy, if it would be possible to introduce Buddhism and Vijja Dhammakaya to every person in the world, they would do so. An important part of this active propagation style is the role of the layperson. The temple has been noted for its emphasis on lay participation.

The propagation of the temple has been analyzed from three scholarly approaches. The earliest analyses of the temple were done by Thai (former) monastics and intellectuals, who criticized the temple for the content of its teachings. These scholars described the temple's teachings as "distorted" from "original" Theravāda Buddhism, and depicted the temple as using these teachings for profit and power. Some of the more well-known of these critics are Phra Payutto and Prawase Wasi, who have concluded that the temple cannot be regarded as part of Theravāda Buddhism. Religious studies scholar Rachelle Scott and Asian Studies scholar Jesada Buaban have pointed out the modernist perspective in this approach, as it emphasizes a deviation from a rational, idealist and universal Buddhism, that is unaffected by local customs and traditions. The second group of scholars were anthropologists and sociologists, both Thai and non-Thai, who mostly studied the question why the temple had been so effective in its propagation. Most scholars in this group emphasized the popularity of the temple among middle-class Thai from the cities, and the ability of the temple to appeal to middle class attitudes and use modern technology. (Note: Buaban states that middle class has often not been clearly defined by this group of scholars.) The third group are scholars who believe that Thailand should become a secular state with no state intervention in religion. These scholars downplay the true Buddhism–false Buddhism dichotomy, and believe that Wat Phra Dhammakaya should be given freedom in propagating its views, as long as they do not infringe on human rights. Some western scholars, such as Duncan McCargo, historian David Streckfuss and legal scholar Mark Templeton, have voiced similar opinions. Furthermore, some prominent secular state proponents have heavily criticized the first group of scholars as inconsistent, as they often rely on the support of the state in their understanding and enforcement of "true Buddhism". According to Surapot Thaweesak, they only apply their critical view of "false Buddhism" to their political and religious opponents, but not their proponents who support them by political power, usually through undemocratic means.

=== Dhammakaya meditation ===
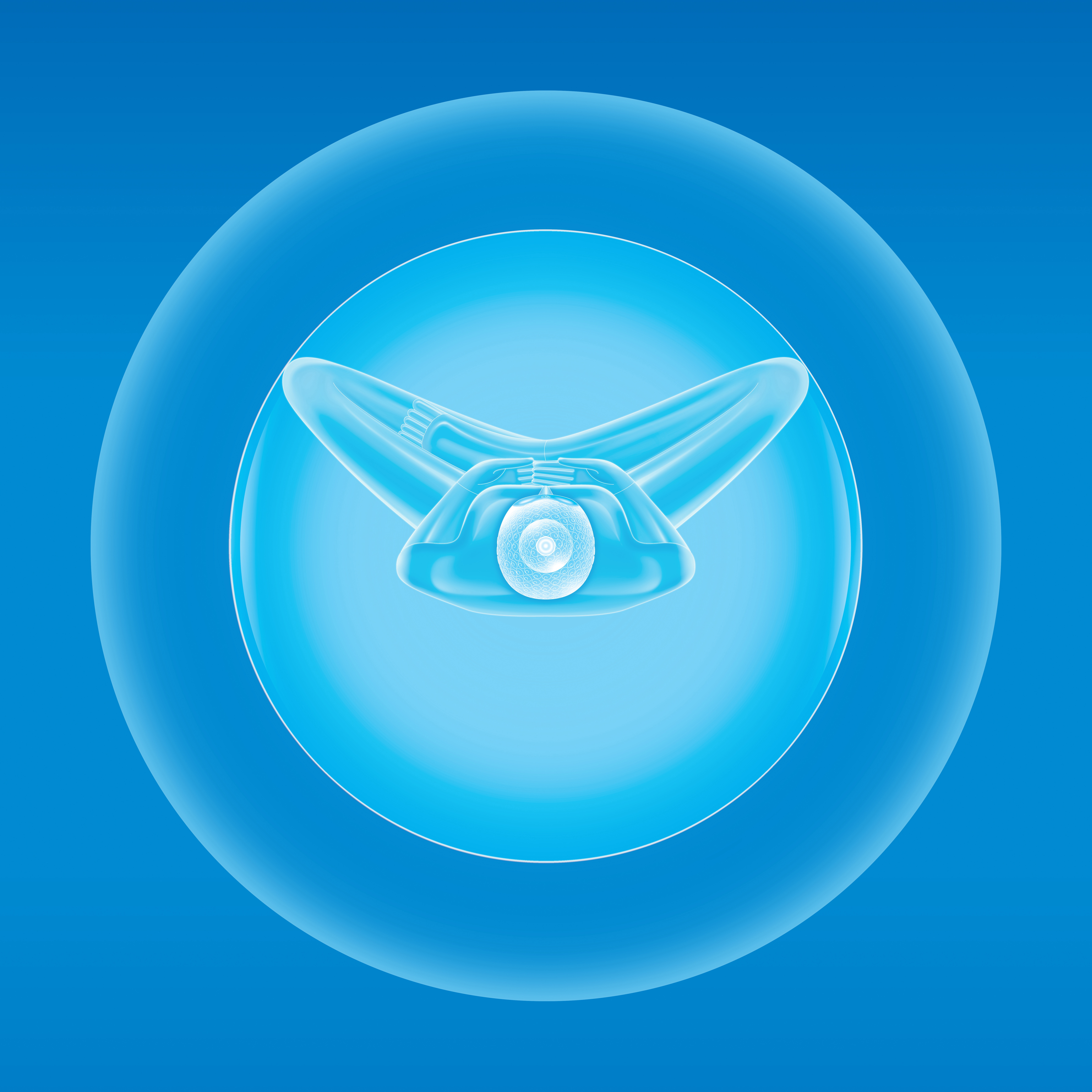
Top view of a Buddha image, as used in Dhammakaya meditation

The temple is known for its emphasis on meditation. Central to the temple and the Dhammakaya tradition is the idea that Dhammakaya meditation was the method through which the Buddha became enlightened, a method which was forgotten but has been revived by Luang Pu Sodh Candasaro. In Thai, this method is also called Vijjā Dhammakāya, a meditation method scholars have linked to the Borān tradition that existed in Thai Buddhism prior to late 19th century reforms. According to the tradition, the principles of Dhammakaya meditation were discovered by Luang Pu Sodh Candasaro on the full-moon night of October 1916 at Wat Botbon, Bangkuvieng, Nonthaburi. Essential to the meditation method is the center of the body: whatever technique someone might use to meditate, the mind can only attain to a higher level through this center, according to Luang Pu Sodh. This center is also believed to play a fundamental role in the birth and death of an individual. Traditionally, a crystal ball is used to maintain focus at this point, but other objects can be used as well, Wat Phra Dhammakaya has taught people in the Solomon Islands to visualize a coconut and has taught Muslims to visualize religious symbols such as a crescent moon to maintain focus at the center.

Dhammakaya meditation has both samatha and vipassanā stages. The process of concentration in Dhammakaya meditation correlates with the description of samatha meditation in the Visuddhimagga, specifically kasiṇa meditation. Luang Pu Sodh usually explained the process of attainment in the method in terms of inner bodies (Pali: kāya), existing within every human being. These are successively more subtle, and come in pairs. These inner bodies ultimately lead to the Dhammakāya, the Dhamma-body, which is described as the shape of a Buddha sitting within oneself. The vipassanā stage of Dhammakaya meditation is done by contemplating the three marks of existence of the lower mundane inner bodies after reaching the Dhamma-body.

Dhammakaya meditation at the higher levels is also believed to bring forth abhiññā, mental powers that can be used for the benefit of society at large. Examples include stories of miraculous events such as Luang Pu Sodh performing healings, and meditation stopping the Allies from dropping an atom bomb on Bangkok due to the Japanese occupation of Thailand in World War II. Similarly, Wat Phra Dhammakaya has included claims of miracles in its PR along with images of amulets with miraculous powers. According to Seeger, such claims and widespread use of miracles by the temple have been one of the sources of criticism from the traditional Thai Buddhist establishment. Practitioners of Dhammakaya Meditation believe that meditation in group is a means to "help overcome the influence of evil Mara" against this world. This is seen by some adherents to be both an individual and collective responsibility. Dhammakaya meditation has influenced several notable teachers outside of the tradition as well.

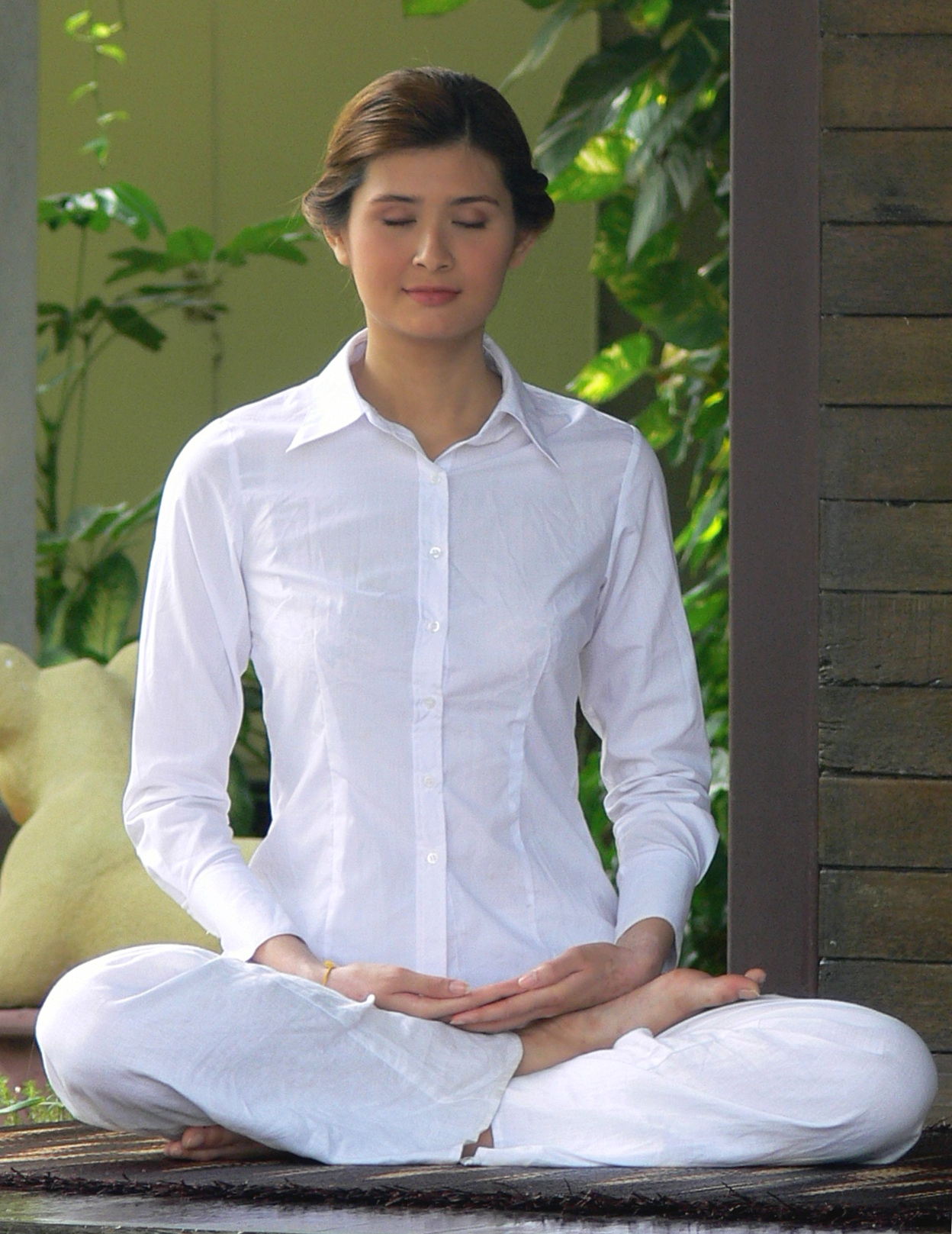
In the temple's teachings, the three practices of giving, morality and mental development are the main focus, the latter of which includes mostly meditation.

==== Anattā and Niṛvāna ====
It is Dhammakaya meditation that makes the temple stand out from other forms of Theravāda Buddhism. According to the philosopher Suwanna Satha-Anand, the tradition believes that meditation and the attainment of the Dhammakaya is the only way to Niṛvāna. According to the Dhammakaya tradition, the Buddha made the discovery that Niṛvāna is nothing less than the true Self, the Dhammakāya, a spiritual essence. The tradition believes that this essence of the Buddha and Niṛvāna exist as a literal reality within each individual. The not-self teaching (Pali: anattā) is considered by the tradition as a method to let go of what is not the self, to attain the "true self".

Wat Phra Dhammakaya is part of the Dhammakaya tradition-related larger doctrinal controversy in Thai Buddhism. Some of the beliefs and practices of the Dhammakaya tradition – such as about Niṛvāna, "true self" and meditation – have been criticized as allegedly opposing or rejecting the mainstream Theravāda teachings and practices by traditional Thai Buddhist institutions. (Note: See Scott 2009, pp. 3, 82, 129–130, 140: "... critique of the Dhammakaya Temple's wealth and alleged heretical teachings and practices ..." (p. 3); "... high ranking monastic officials who alleged that Phra Dhammachayo had violated the monastic code of conduct by teaching heretical views on nirvana". (pp. 129–130); ff.; Scott (2009, pp. 231, 248); Taylor (2007, pp. 55–57) ; and Mackenzie 2007, pp. 16–7, 50–2, 175–9: "Thailand's highly regarded scholar monk, Phra Dhammapitaka [Prayudh Payutto] sought to identify Wat Phra Dhammakaya's position as heretical by commenting, 'In all Buddhist scriptures, both the Tipitaka and the commentaries, there is no evidence that nibbana is atta. But there is much evidence that nibbana is anatta ...'" (p. 51); "... his understanding of the Pali scriptures clearly demonstrates to the Thai that the movement is heretical in its beliefs" (p. 16)) According to Seeger, the bulk of Thai Theravāda Buddhism – including a number of Thai scholars, academics, monks and social critics – reject the true-self teaching of Dhammakaya, and insist upon "all and everything is no-self" (Pali: sabbe dhamma anattā) as the Buddha's real teaching.

The anattā concept has been a subject of intense debate in Thailand, dating as far back as 1939, when the 12th Supreme Patriarch of Thailand published a book arguing that Niṛvāna was the "true-self". This dispute arose again in the 1990s when monastic scholar monk Phra Payutto published a book stating that the Dhammakaya tradition's teaching that "nibbāna is attā", was outside of Theravāda Buddhism. Payutto states in his book The Dhammakaya Case that the "Nibbāna [Nirvana] is Higher Self (attā)" teaching of Dhammakaya "insults" the Buddhist canonical and post-canonical teachings. He continues that the historic Theravāda teachings emphasize nirvana in the context of anattā, and the "nirvana as attā" is not an acceptable interpretation. Payutto has been criticized in return by a number of Thai academics and news commentators for being "narrow-minded", "attached to scriptures", "dogmatist" and a "purist". The Thai columnist Sopon Pornchokchai has accused Payutto of performing sloppy research. Although some scholars have criticized Dhammakaya's teachings on Niṛvāna in the past, these critiques garnered virtually no public attention until the 1990s when Phra Payutto published his book. According to Scott, Phra Payutto's word was largely considered authoritative in Thai Theravāda Buddhism, and thus legitimized Dhammakaya's interpretation of Niṛvāna as controversial.

Wat Phra Dhammakaya has responded in different ways to the debate of self and not-self. Wat Phra Dhammakaya's assistant-abbot Luang phi Thanavuddho wrote a book about the topic in response to critics.

It has been pointed out that followers of the temple themselves generally tend to not show much interest in the self–not-self debate and are more concerned about how Dhammakaya meditation improves their mind.

The temple often uses positive terms to describe Niṛvāna. Scott states that Wat Phra Dhammakaya publications and discourse describe Niṛvāna as being the state of supreme happiness, rather than the traditional Theravāda's via negativa description of "nirvana is not samsara". She states that this may be one of the reasons why the temple seems so attractive to new members. In its teachings on how meditation can help improve health and the quality of modern life, the temple has been compared to the Vipassanā Movement of S.N Goenka. The temple's emphasis on meditation is expressed in several ways. Accessories for meditation are for sale in stores around the temple, and every gathering that is organized by the temple will feature some time for meditation. The temple emphasizes the usefulness of meditating in a group, and teaches that public meditations have a powerful effect on the minds of the temple's practitioners.

=== Cleanliness and order ===
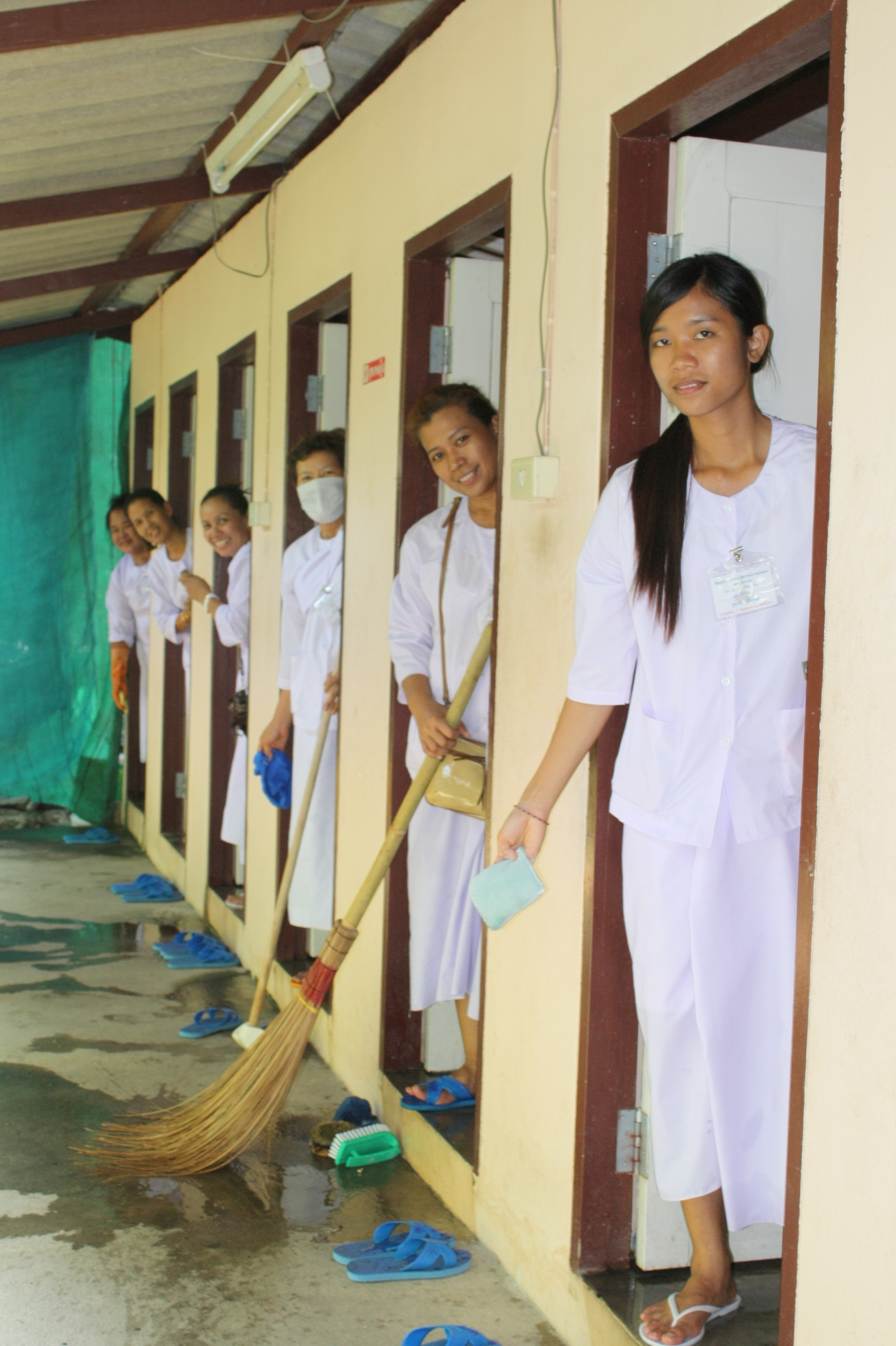
Practitioners are encouraged to keep things tidy and clean, through organized cleaning activities.

Luang Por Dhammajayo was heavily influenced by Maechi Chandra Khonnokyoong in his teachings. He turned the Dhammakaya meditation method "into an entire guide of living" (religious studies scholar Justin McDaniel), emphasizing cleanliness, orderliness and quiet, as a morality by itself, and as a way to support meditation practice. In Jim Taylor's words, the temple "eschews disorder". In Wat Phra Dhammakaya, ceremonies are commonly held on Sundays rather than the traditional lunar calendar-based Uposatha days. Free buses drive to the temple. Lay people joining the ceremonies are strongly encouraged to wear white, a traditional custom. No smoking, drinking or flirting is allowed on the temple terrain, nor newspapers, animals or fortune-telling. Traditional, noisy temple fairs are not held. Children attending activities at Wat Phra Dhammakaya are taken care of through Sunday school and crèche while their parents attend the adult meditation sessions in the Great Sapha Dhammakaya Hall. There are activities for children and young people: people of all ages attend activities. Moreover, the temple teaches regularly about traditional Thai manners, explained as the heart of being Thai. In short, the temple's appearance is orderly, and can be described as "a contemporary aesthetic" (Scott), which appeals to practitioners, especially the modern Bangkok middle class. Practitioners are also encouraged to keep things tidy and clean, through organized cleaning activities. A strong work ethic is promoted through these activities, in which the most menial work is seen as the most valuable and fruitful. The temple's emphasis on discipline and order is expressed in its huge and detailed ceremonies.

=== Merit-making and fundraising ===
Wat Phra Dhammakaya has a vision of a future ideal society. The temple emphasizes that the daily application of Buddhism will lead the practitioner and society to prosperity and happiness in this life and the next, and the temple expects a high commitment to that effect. The temple emphasizes the making of merit, and explains how through the law of kamma merit yields its fruits, in this world and future rebirths. The temple teaches that its practices can help "students to prepare for college entrance exams, transform wayward teens, cultivate confidence in professionals, and bring families together". Donors are typically very joyful about their giving to the temple and the merit-making, while critics argue that "merit was being marketed as some kind of commodity which could be exchanged for money", and a form of "religious consumerism".

The Dhammakaya Cetiya, a monument in the temple complex.

Wat Phra Dhammakaya practices have sometimes been criticised by some attackers as a "prosperity movement", because members believe giving to the temple coupled with the meditation practices can ensure their own "prosperity and status". The temple's approach to commercializing donations is seen in other prosperity movements of Thailand. Wat Phra Dhammakaya relies on donations and merit making to build temples and operate its organization. It runs consumer-savvy media placement and billboards to deploy "consumerist competitive and advertising strategy with the traditional belief of merit accumulation which ends up in the merchandization of merit", states Mackenzie. This is echoed by anthropologist Sandra Cate. The donors of the temple are promised rewards in future rebirths, and their donations are recognized in public ceremonies. For instance, those who gift regular monthly donations become a part of the "millionaires' club" who are guaranteed "rebirth as a millionaire" in future rebirths. Leading donors are publicly recognized as examples, and donor groups are credited by certain titles.

Wat Phra Dhammakaya, states Mackenzie, offers "a variety of convenient options" to donate, leveraging the traditional Thai belief in karmic theory as the accumulation of merit through the cycle of rebirths. In the studies of anthropologist Apinya Fuengfusakul she compares the merit-making at Wat Phra Dhammakaya with the marketing of a product, pointing out how the temple makes merit-making very convenient and pleasant. However, the temple does not see this as compromising the sacred element of Buddhism, but rather as amplifying it. The temple teaches that a temple must be 'suitable' (Pali: sappaya) for spiritual practice, a term also referred to in Wat Paknam.

The height of the criticism of the temple's fundraising occurred in the late 1990s, during the onset of 1997 Asian Financial crisis. Scholar Ravee Phawilai of Chulalongkorn University went as far as accusing the temple of "commercializing Buddhism to seek money and power". According to one CNN news reporter, the criticism against the temple may reflect a general criticism of Thai Buddhism as a whole, as the commercializing of Buddhism became the most controversial religious problem in the 1990s in Thailand. Although many of the temple's methods and teachings were not unique to Wat Phra Dhammakaya, the criticism came at a moment when the temple was very noticeable, due to its size and the major fundraising the temple was doing at the time. Scholars have pointed out that the timing of the temple's fundraising may have been a cause of the criticism, as the persistent fundraising was done during the Asian economic crisis.

Religious Studies scholar Rachelle Scott concludes that criticism of Wat Phra Dhammakaya can mostly be categorized as criticism on a religious organization that uses material rewards to persuade someone to believe something, and the tendency of critics to regard a religious organization's propagation as an attack on the beliefs of the community. It has been pointed out that many people are afraid that, given Wat Phra Dhammakaya's size and popularity, the temple may exert too much influence in the Saṅgha, or take over the Saṅgha.

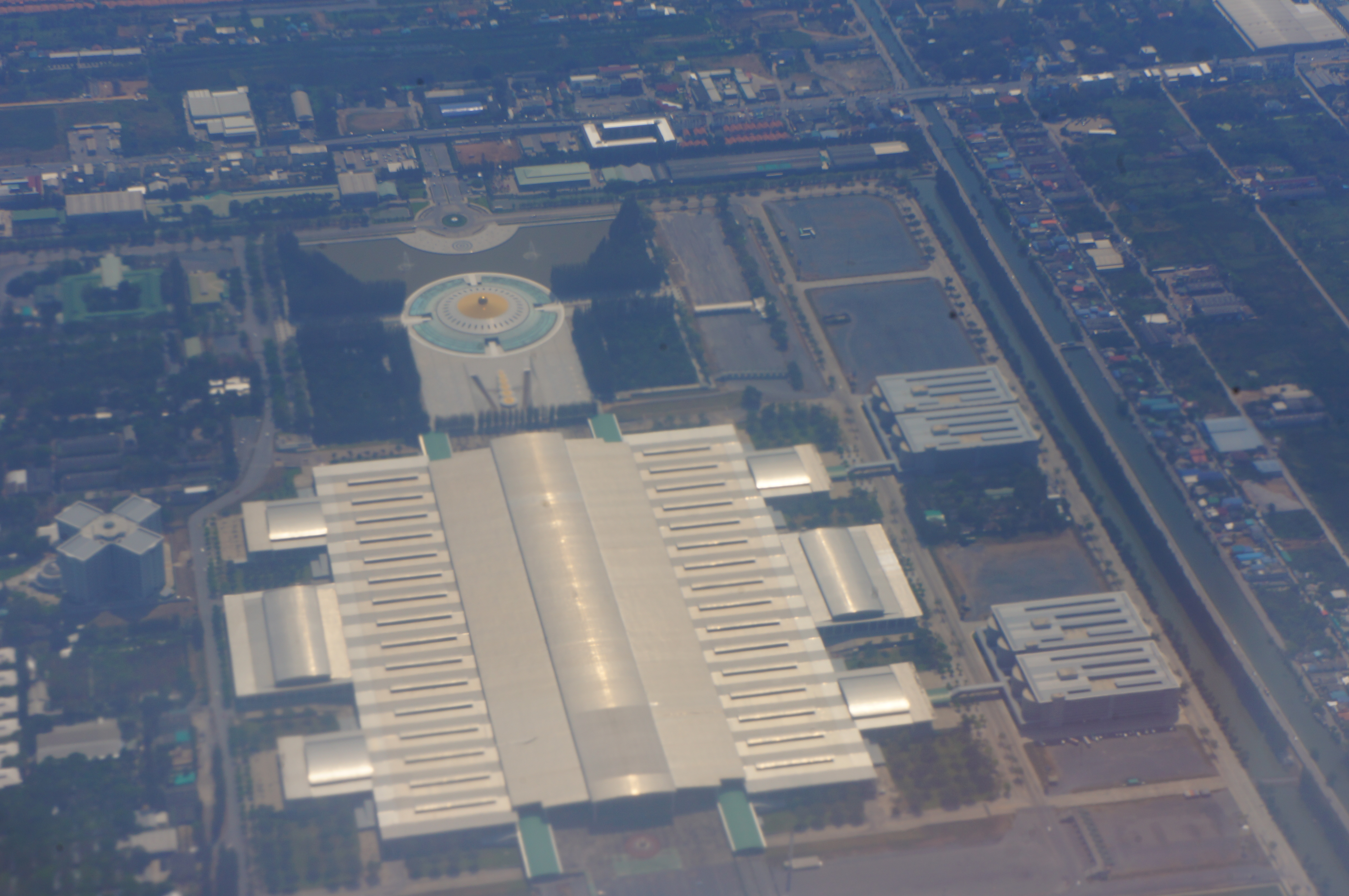
Aerial view of the newer areas of the temple

Scott has argued that criticism against Wat Phra Dhammakaya, its fundraising practices and teachings on merit-making, partly reflect historical changes in Thai society with regard to wealth and merit-making. The relation between giving and wealth is ubiquitous in vernacular Pāli literature, and many stories of exemplary donors exist, such as the stories of the bankers Anāthapiṇḍika and Jōtika. The association of wealth with merits done has deeply affected many Buddhist countries. At the turn of the twentieth century, however, perspectives of merit-making had changed in traditional Buddhist societies, as merit-making became associated with capitalism and consumerism, which had been rising in South and Southeast Asia. In the early 1990s, there was a royalist revival in Thailand, and Thai Buddhism became associated with the traditional village life and a sole rejection of material wealth, as reflected in King Bhumibol's sufficiency economy philosophy. Also, in some Buddhist countries, such as Thailand, there is a tendency among teachers and practitioners to dismiss and even revile merit-making in favor of other Buddhist teachings about detachment and attaining Niṛvāna, for which Buddhist Studies scholar Lance Cousins has coined the term ultimatism.

=== Pāramī's and self-development ===
According to the temple, Pāramīs (lit. "perfections") are formed when people do merits consistently, and these merits become 'concentrated' (Thai: กลั่นตัว) through the passage of time. This happens when people dedicate their lives to merit-making. Wat Phra Dhammakaya does not consider pāramīs solely the domain of Buddhas-to-be, but as necessary for everyone aiming for the Buddhist goal of release from suffering. There are traditionally ten pāramīs, that is, giving, morality, renunciation, wisdom, effort, patience, truth, resolute determination, loving-kindness and equanimity. All of these can be practiced through the three practices of giving, morality and mental development, which includes mostly meditation. The practice of giving and merit-making in Wat Phra Dhammakaya's perspective is therefore a practice of self-training and self-sacrifice, in which merit is dependent on intention, not merely the amount donated. The ideal of giving as a form of building character is expressed in the temple's culture with the words Cittaṃ me, meaning 'I am victorious', referring to the overcoming of inner defilements (Pali: kilesa).

To explain the importance of self-transformation, Wat Phra Dhammakaya often refers to the Maṇgala Sutta, a Buddhist sutta (discourse) that emphasizes ethics. The ethics contests the temple has been organizing throughout the country since its early years are heavily based on this sutta. Also, the temple often refers to traditional narratives from the Tipiṭaka regarding exemplary donors and the fruits that merit-making yields. The emphasis on individual ethics is also expressed in the temple's view on society: the temple emphasizes strengthening the individual's morality more than changing the system of society, and measures the welfare of the state by the virtue of its citizens. Field research also confirms that the temple's practitioners believe the individual's lack of virtue to be the main reason for current economic problems. Indeed, every year Earth Day is celebrated in the temple, on which the motto of the temple "Clean the world, clean the mind" is brought forward. The temple states that the environment will only improve if one starts working on clearing up one's own mind.

=== Spiritual friendship ===
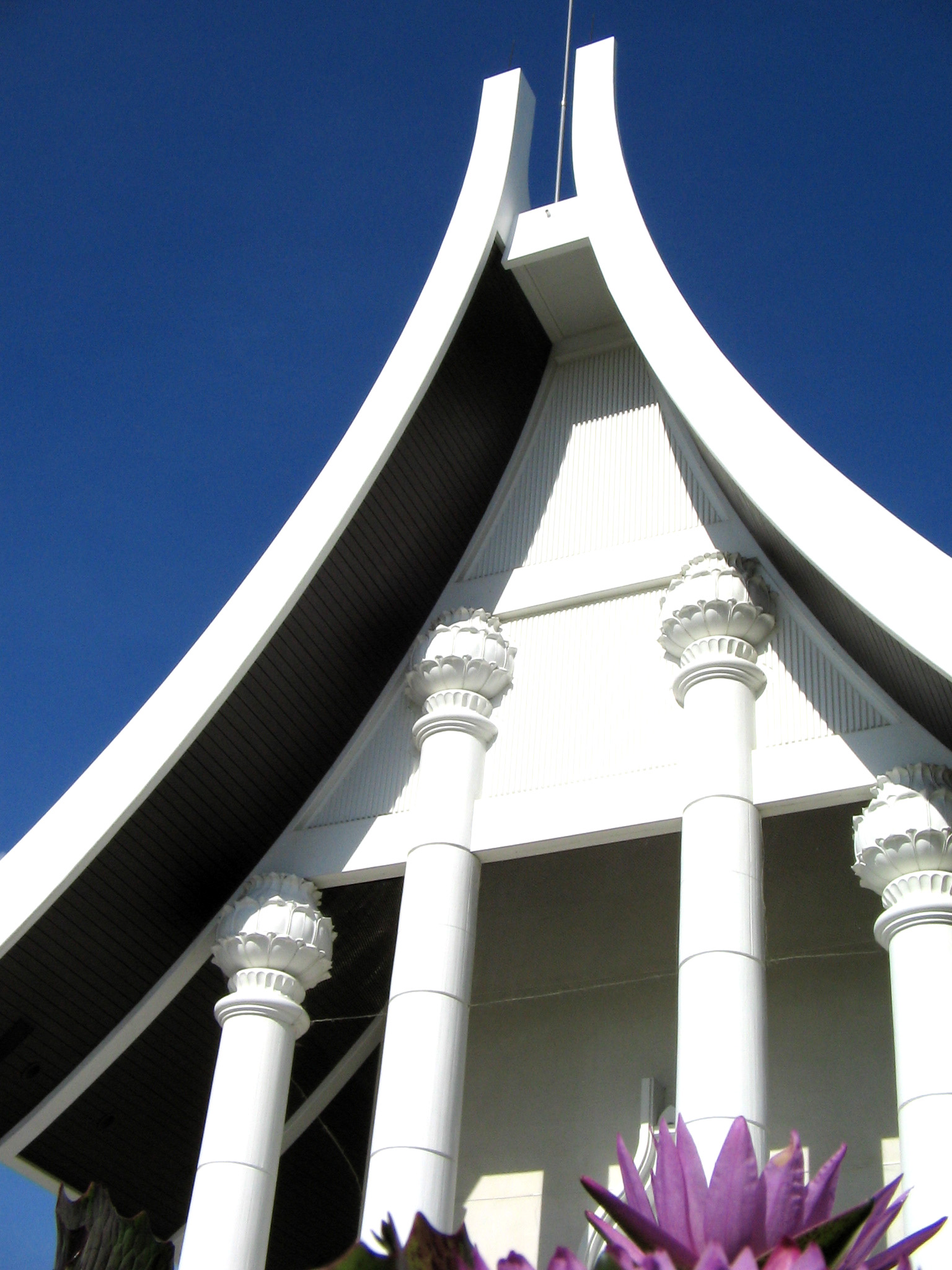
The ubosot in the old area of the temple

Participants in the temple's activities report that the temple feels like a family. According to Taylor, the temple's success may be partly explained by the flexible social structure of the temple, allowing for openness to newcomers. The temple organizes its followers into groups with certain interests. In surveys, one major reason for joining the temple's activities is the structure and clarity of the teachings. The temple's lifestyle promotes good family values and emphasizes a network of like-minded friends to facilitate spiritual development. Wat Phra Dhammakaya encourages people to persuade others to make merit, because such persuasion is in itself considered a merit. In activities of the temple, even on retreats, ample opportunity is therefore given for socializing and spiritual friendship. In teachings of the temple, practitioners are encouraged to set up kalyāṇamitta homes ('homes of good spiritual friends') to meditate together with friends and family, and practitioners are trained to take on leading roles. Wat Phra Dhammakaya makes it a point that homes, temples and schools should unite in creating responsible members of society, and organizes programs to that effect. Communities of kalyāṇamittas also have an exemplary effect, according to the temple. One of the reasons why the temple emphasizes huge gatherings during ceremonies, as stated in the temple's literature, is that such gatherings will effect that "people of the world will stop, think and ask themselves why so many people have gathered in one place to meditate (...) and they will strive to find the answer for themselves".

Wat Phra Dhammakaya very much emphasizes respect for one's seniors and people in higher rank. This holds for lay people towards monks, but also amongst lay people. Qualities such as being easy to advise, being humble, being soft-spoken and so on, are encouraged and promoted through the temple's activities and teachings. Such qualities are also connected to accomplishment in meditation practice. Fuengfusakul speculates that the culture of respect of Wat Phra Dhammakaya has its roots in the seniority system of Kasetsart University, from which the first generation of the temple's monks were mostly graduated. Kasetsart was one of the first universities where the Buddhist student society was revived and promoted by the temple, and Buddhist societies at many other universities followed the model of the Kasetsart Buddhist society. Indeed, one of the main activities at the Buddhist societies led by the temple is the revival of the custom of Wai Khru, a ceremony for students to express gratitude and respect to their teacher. Alma mater traditions aside, Litalien speculates that Wat Phra Dhammakaya's emphasis on respect for hierarchy and seniority comes from the conviction that position and status are gained by merit-making and karma.

=== Thi Sut Haeng Tham ===
Wat Phra Dhammakaya's teachings on merit-making, morality and meditation are not only claimed by the temple to bring about individual happiness and world peace, but also serve a higher aim. The temple teaches that the ultimate purpose of one's life is to develop pāramīs on the path of the bodhisattas. The temple's practitioners aim for Buddhahood, but call this aim Thi Sut Haeng Tham (Thai: ที่สุดแห่งธรรม), literally 'the utmost of Dhamma'. This goal is described as helping to bring all living beings to Niṛvāna, which requires an utmost effort. In this context pāramī is also defined as a habit to put one's life on the line to develop goodness.

=== The miraculous ===
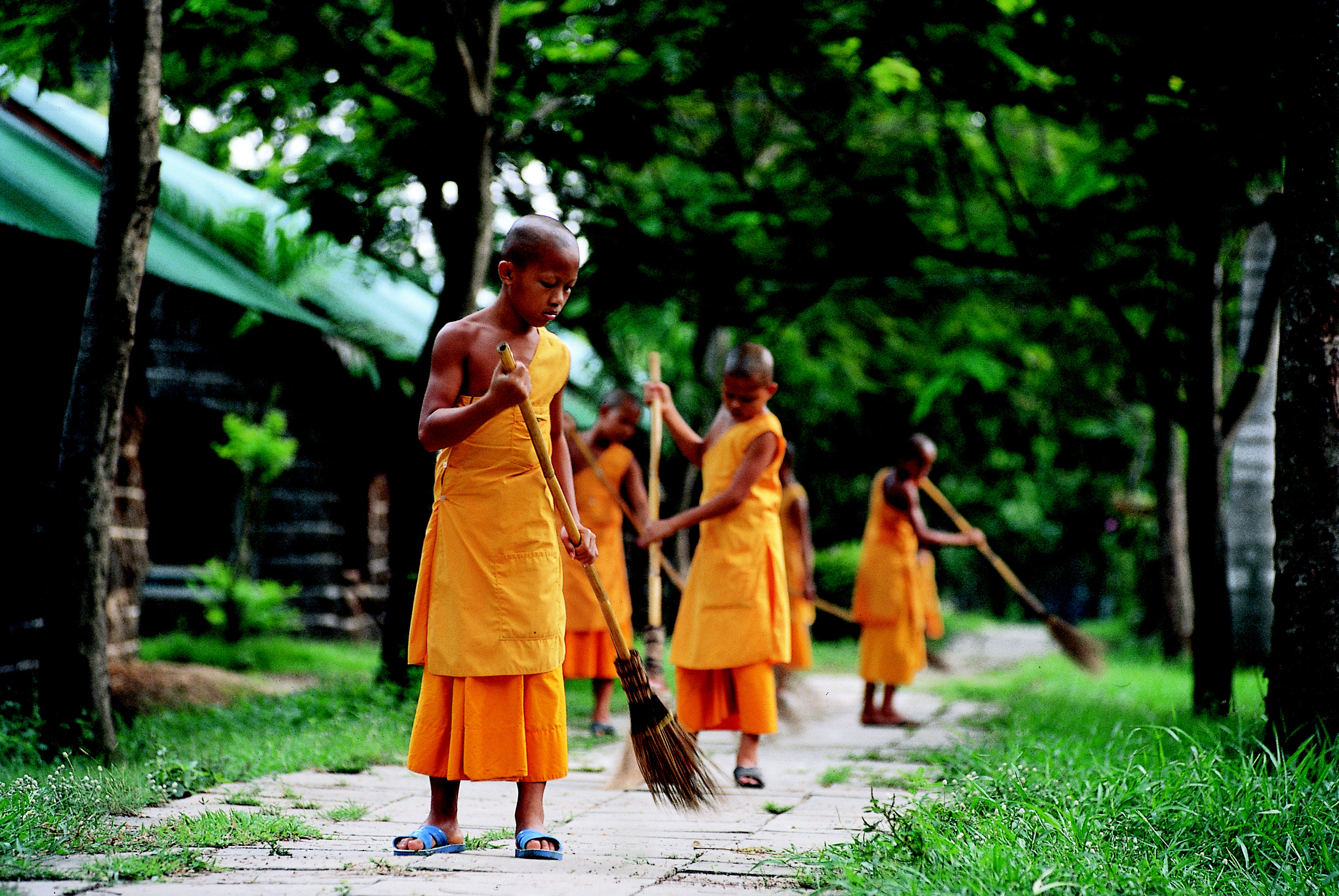
Novices sweeping the temple

Although Wat Phra Dhammakaya does not involve itself in traditional magical rituals, fortune telling and giving lottery numbers, it doesn't oppose everything that is miraculous. In the biographies of Luang Pu Sodh and Maechi Chandra, the temple often relates of miraculous events relating to the meditation prowess of these two masters, thereby establishing the value of the lineage. Mackenzie points out that not everyone who comes to the temple is interested in the miraculous, but it is nevertheless a part of the temple's appeal: "Some members especially appreciate the logic and relevance of the Dhamma talks, others draw much from the effect the cetiya and other buildings have on them, others place a special value on meeting their friends and clearly many have a very strong focus on meditation. I have also met members who look to experience the miraculous at the temple..." On a similar note, practitioners believe that meditation not only calms the mind, but also has a miraculous effect on the outside world, especially the meditations every first Sunday of the month. (See § Other activities) Fuengfusakul points out, however, that the temple tends to downplay the gap between the miraculous and the rational or scientific, and draws on science to explain the miraculous or psychic.

== The foundation ==
Logo of the Dhammakaya Foundation

=== Organization structure ===
Wat Phra Dhammakaya is legally represented by the Dhammakaya Foundation, described as the modern equivalent of the traditional 'temple committee' (Thai: กรรมการวัด). Founded in 1970 under the name Prasit Foundation, the foundation was in 1985 renamed the Dhammakaya Foundation. Later, a second foundation was founded to finance the worldwide activities of the temple, the Khun Yai Ajan Maharatana Khonnokyoong Foundation.

The Dhammakaya foundation has a complex organization structure, and is more formalized than traditional Thai temples. It is modeled on and managed like a modern organization. Despite its modern methods, the temple adheres highly to a traditional hierarchy, and Luang Por Dhammajayo as a leader. He is the president of the foundation and used to be the abbot of the temple, assisted by deputy-abbot and vice-president Luang Por Dattajīvo. Thus, the foundation is intrinsically connected to the temple. There are several departments in the foundation that are run by assistant-abbots, who report to the abbot and deputy-abbot: a human resource center, as well as a support center that helps with facilitating ceremonies, and departments for maintenance, fundraising, education and proselytization. The responsibility for lay people is further subdivided in sixty-two groups. The personnel of the temple consists of monastics, full-time employees, workers and volunteers. Full-time employees will sometimes ordain after a while, but their ordination is different from that of males who ordain without having been an employee. Former employees usually take a vow for lifelong ordination in a special ceremony, and often have high coordinating positions as monks. Following Thai custom, the temple does not provide a full ordination as bhikkhunī for women, but there are training programs for female staff.

Among lay personnel, the full-time employees are expected to follow the eight precepts, behave in an orderly way, and spend their lives in the temple, without a paid job or residence outside the temple. Just like in the Dhammadayada training programs, full-time employees are trained, including a probation period before being employed. They are not paid a full-fledged salary, but receive some stipend, as well as some welfare services. Full-time employees have an important role in the temple's active approach of spreading Buddhism: they complement monastics who have more limitations because of the Vinaya. They are also meant to be role models for the public at large. Wat Phra Dhammakaya is known for its relatively high-educated monastics and full-time lay personnel. A high percentage possesses a bachelor's degree.

In the 1980s, Wat Phra Dhammakaya was very centrally organized, which led to problems within the organization. From the early 1990s onward, the temple began to invite professional management and law consultants to develop its organisation processes, and decision-making was distributed downwards to supervisory committees.

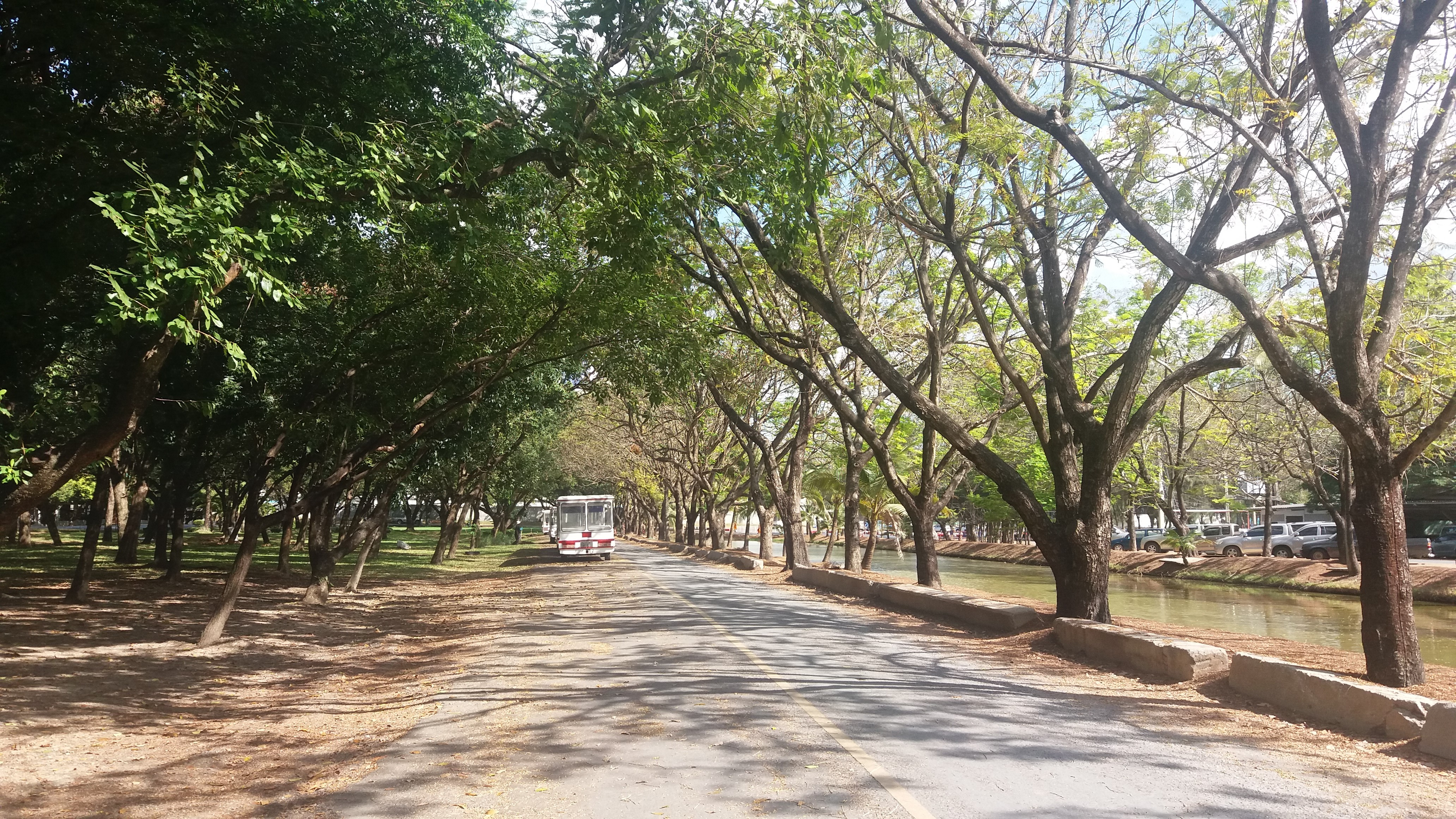
Road with trees in the temple

=== Objectives ===
On its website, the foundation lists seven goals:

- To teach Dhammakaya meditation;
- To promote and support Buddhist studies;
- To promote and support Dhamma education for both monastics and lay people;
- To provide support for the people living in the temple;
- To build and maintain the World Dhammakaya Center;
- To build and maintain the temple;
- To build and maintain an academic institute that offers all levels of education, from pre-school to university, in which Dhamma education is provided together with the normal curriculum.

Another list of five objectives underlying the work of the foundation is sometimes also mentioned:

- To provide facilities for the teaching of meditation and the study of the culture that underlies world peace;
- To create virtue in society by instilling morality, with special emphasis on the younger generation;
- To promote the recognition and praise of those of exceptional virtue in society;
- To produce materials in print and other media to promote peace, social harmony, virtue and morality;
- To provide humanitarian services.

According to Luang Por Dattajīvo, the temple's buildings aim to gather people and cultivate the spirit of the Dhammakaya slogan "World Peace through Inner Peace". In the Thai language, the temple has the motto "We are born to build up our pāramīs" is also used. Another motto is "Dhammakaya is the goal of life". The last two mottos are often combined in one sentence, in which the fulfillment of pāramīs is the path, and the attainment of the Dhammakaya at the highest level is the aim. This attainment is equated with Niṛvāna.

== Layout of building complex ==
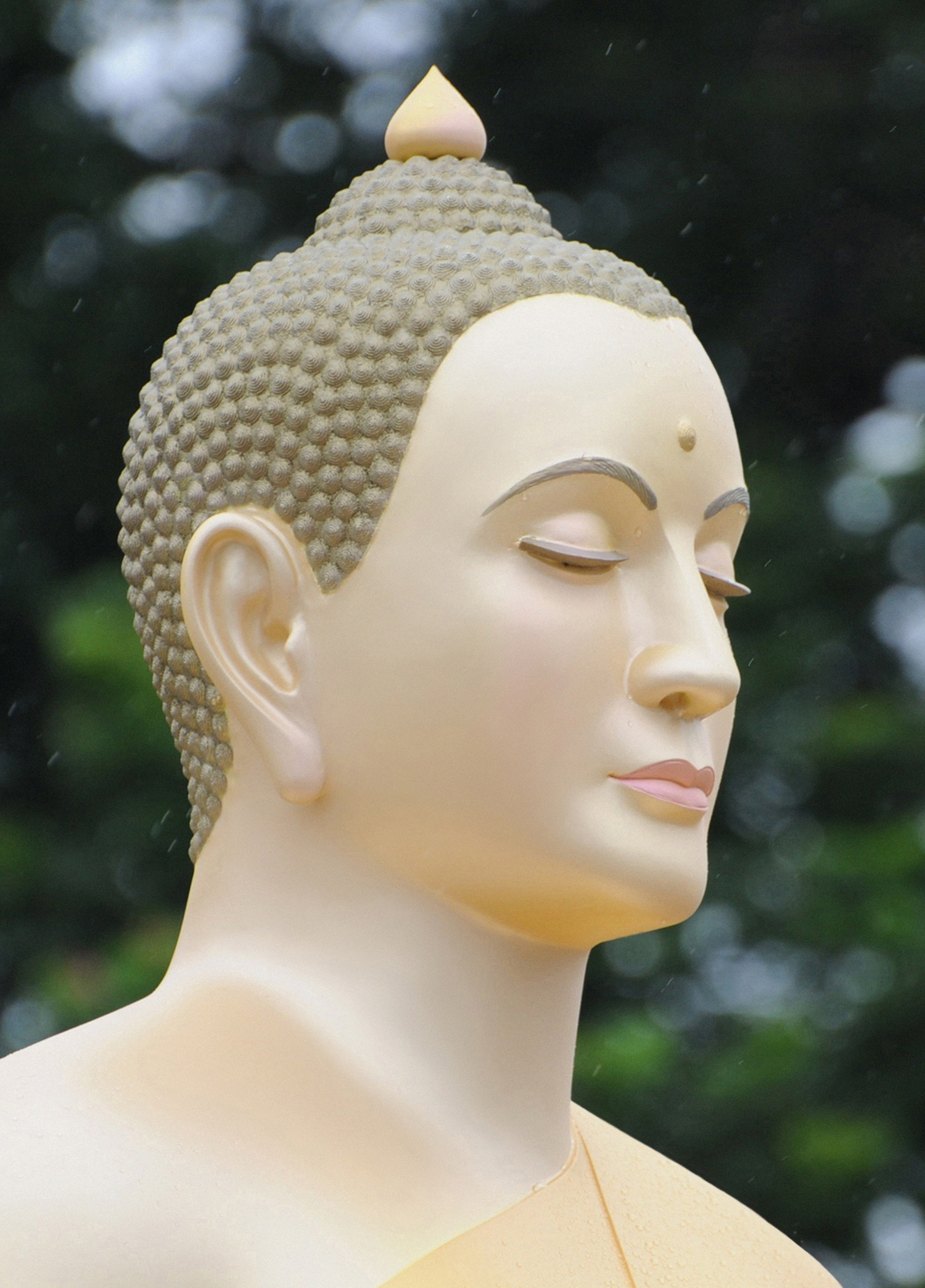
The temple's Buddha images are made following the traditional 32 Signs of a Great Man.

The general appearance of the temple is clean and orderly. The temple has many well-maintained gardens and greenery. What is unusual for a Buddhist temple building in Thailand is that the buildings are functionalist with minimal ornamentation, which makes them look futuristically modern and global, although they are based on older tradition.

The temple's area is divided into three parts: the 'Buddha residence area' (Thai: เขตพุทธาวาส), including the Ubosot, and residence areas for monks; the 'Dhamma residence area' (Thai: เขตธรรมาวาส), including the areas for teaching and ceremonies that involve laypeople; and finally, the 'Saṅgha residence area' (Thai: เขตสังฆาวาส), including the areas for monastic ceremonies. Although many Thai temples divide their areas in this fashion, Wat Phra Dhammakaya stands out in that it uses most of the space of the temple's grounds for the Dhamma residence area, providing enough room for the large masses of people that come to the temple's activities, and for the international community. From 1984 onward, the temple's area was greatly expanded. Thus, a distinction can be made between the older areas and the areas which are later expansions.

=== Older areas ===
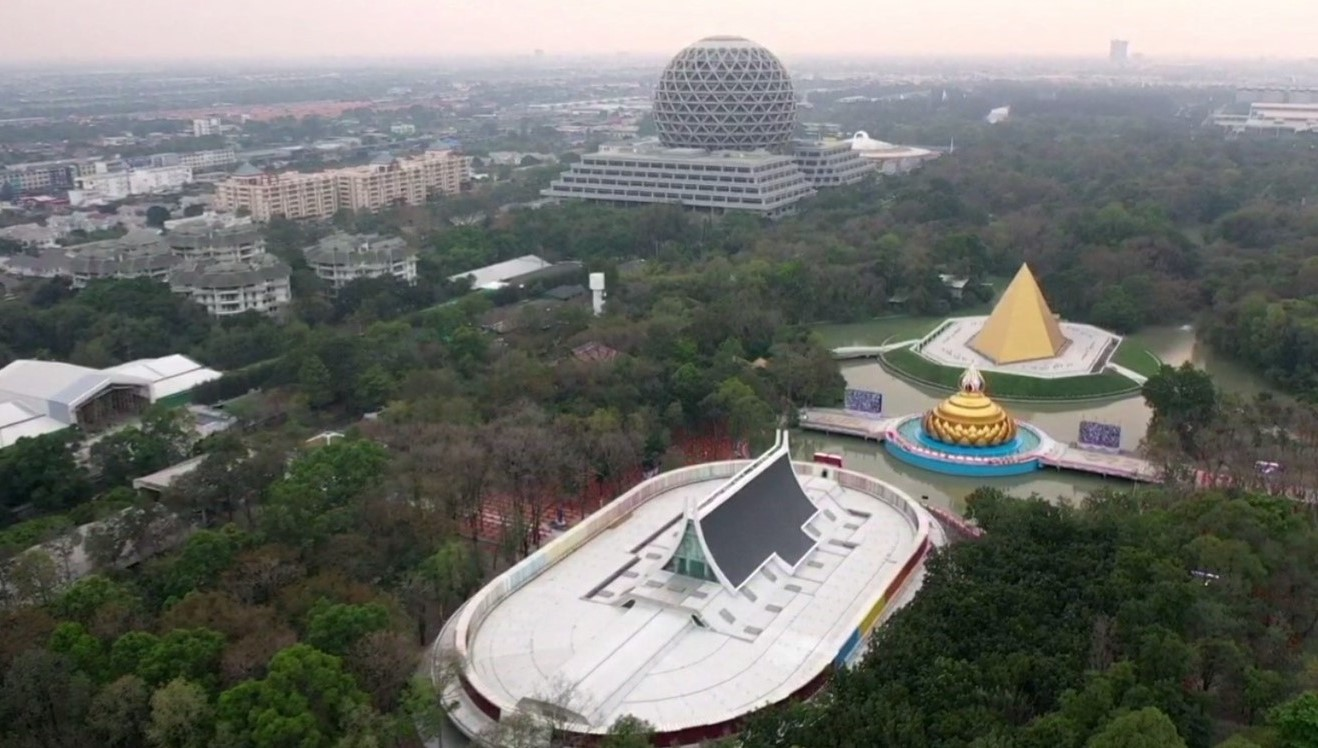
Aerial view of the older areas of the Dhammakaya temple complex

In the older areas the following buildings are important:

- The Ubosot: Designed based on Wat Benchamabophit, the building was awarded an honourable mention by the Association of Siamese Architects (ASA) in 1998. The Buddha image in the ubosot is modern rather than classic Thai. Nevertheless, the temple's Buddha images are made following the traditional thirty-two characteristics of a Great Man, mentioned in the Pāli Canon, and the temple believes they are more authentic than many other types of Buddha images.
- The Memorial Hall of Khun Yai Achan Chandra Khonnokyoong: This hexagonal pyramid-shaped chapel was built in 2003. This two-storey 29 meters (95 ft) tall structure is made of gold-tinted plate glass. The lower floor is a museum with an exhibition, telling the biography of Maechi Chandra Khonnokyoong. The upper floor houses a golden image of Maechi Chandra.
- Tavatimsa: a building where Luang Por Dhammajayo used to undergo treatment for his illness.
- Dhammakaya English Learning Center: a center for the study of English for usage in propagating Buddhism, with foreign teachers.

The Dhammakaya Open University and the kuṭis (residences) for monks are also located in the older sections.

=== The World Dhammakaya Center ===
Since 1984, the number of people joining the ceremonies of the temple exceeded its capacity and prompted the decision to expand the site and the building of the World Dhammakaya Centre, an area of two thousand rai (3.2 km^{2}). Buildings are designed using principles from meditation practice, and, according to the temple, are built to last a thousand years. In the area there are a number of important buildings:

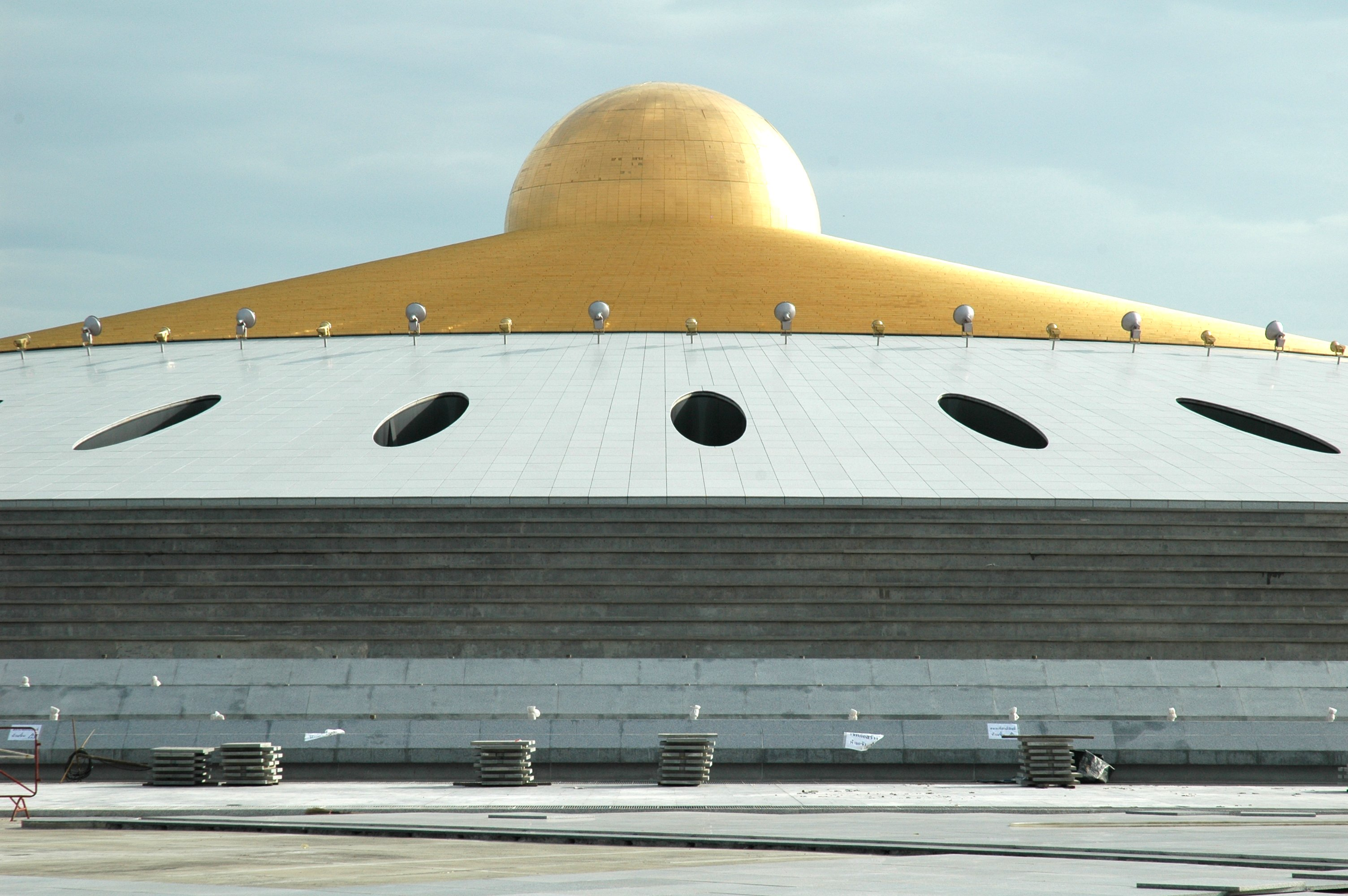
The Memorial Hall of Phramongkolthepmuni

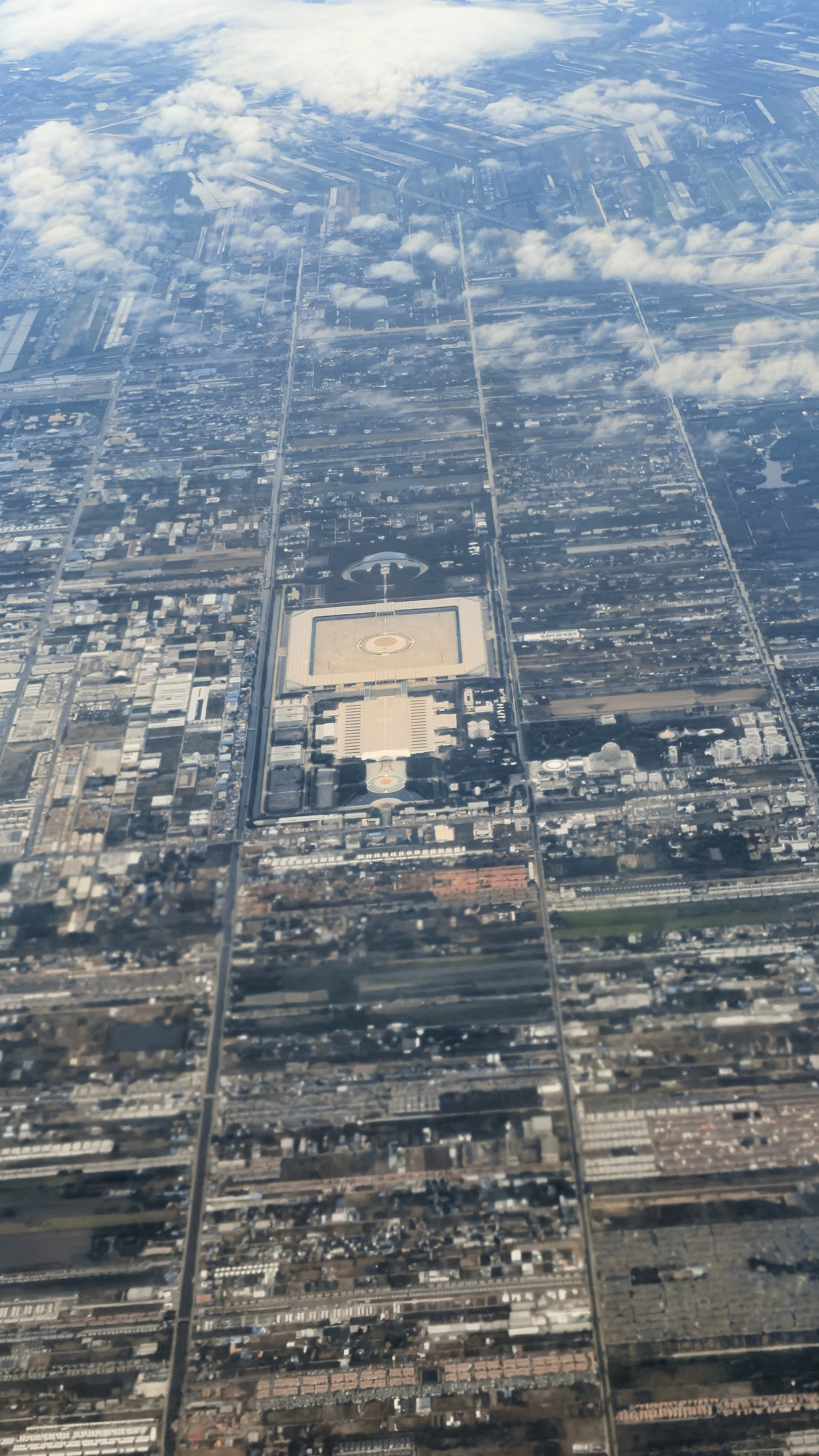
Wat Phra Dhammakaya temple aerial view

- The Dhammakaya Assembly Hall: This hangar-like construction built in 1997 is a multi-functional two-storey building, used for meditation, Buddhist lectures and ceremonies, a crèche and youth training, and monastic conferences. The upper level has been designed to accommodate 150,000 people. The lower level is used primarily for parking but can be used as seating capacity for an additional 150,000 people, if necessary.
- The Great Dhammakaya Cetiya: The Dhammakaya Cetiya is described by the temple as a symbol of world peace through inner peace. The design is based on the architectural style of different ancient stupas, among which are the stupas of Sanchi, Borobodur, Anuradhapura, Shwedagon and the stupas of the Pagan Kingdom. The Cetiya has the shape of a hemispherical dome, thirty-two meters high and one hundred and eight meters in diameter. The hemispherical dome represents the Buddha, the surrounding inner terraces the Dhamma, and the granite outer terraces the Saṅgha. The exterior holds 300,000 Buddha statues, placed on the dome and the terraces. Each of the images has the name of the donor engraved in it, which is an old tradition. Inside the Cetiya are digitally preserved Buddhist texts, another 700,000 Buddha statues and a large central Buddha of 4.5 m made from sterling silver. The central Buddha image symbolizes the possibility of liberation through meditation. The outer terraces of the Cetiya can seat ten thousand monks, whereas the open area around the Cetiya can accommodate 600,000 people. The area has become a meeting-place for Buddhists all over the world, who join the yearly ceremonies. It was officially opened in 2000.
- The Grand Meditation Amphitheatre: The Grand Meditation Amphitheatre is the name of a two-storey stadium-like structure built to accommodate monks, sāmaṇeras (young novices) and people from around the world to meditate and pray. The Amphitheatre has been built around the Cetiya and can accommodate 300,000 people. It was finished in 2004.
- The Memorial Hall of Phramongkolthepmuni: This 108 meters (354 ft) tall circular domed building was finished in 2003 in honor of Luang Pu Sodh Candasaro. It houses a golden statue of Luang Pu Sodh. The building is open to visitors and pilgrims.
- The Dining Hall of Khun Yay Archaraya Chandra Khonnokyoong: Finished in 2004, the Dining Hall of Khun Yay can seat up to six thousand monks. Every day, lay people come to offer food and refreshments to over 1,200 monks and sāmaṇera who reside at the temple.
- The Pariyattidhamma School: This is a school in which Buddhism and Pāli is taught to laypeople and monastics, at different levels. The school was founded in 1985.
- The Sixtieth Year Building: This is a building that is planned to be used for Dhammakaya meditation at an advanced level. On the roof 300,000 Buddha images have been placed.

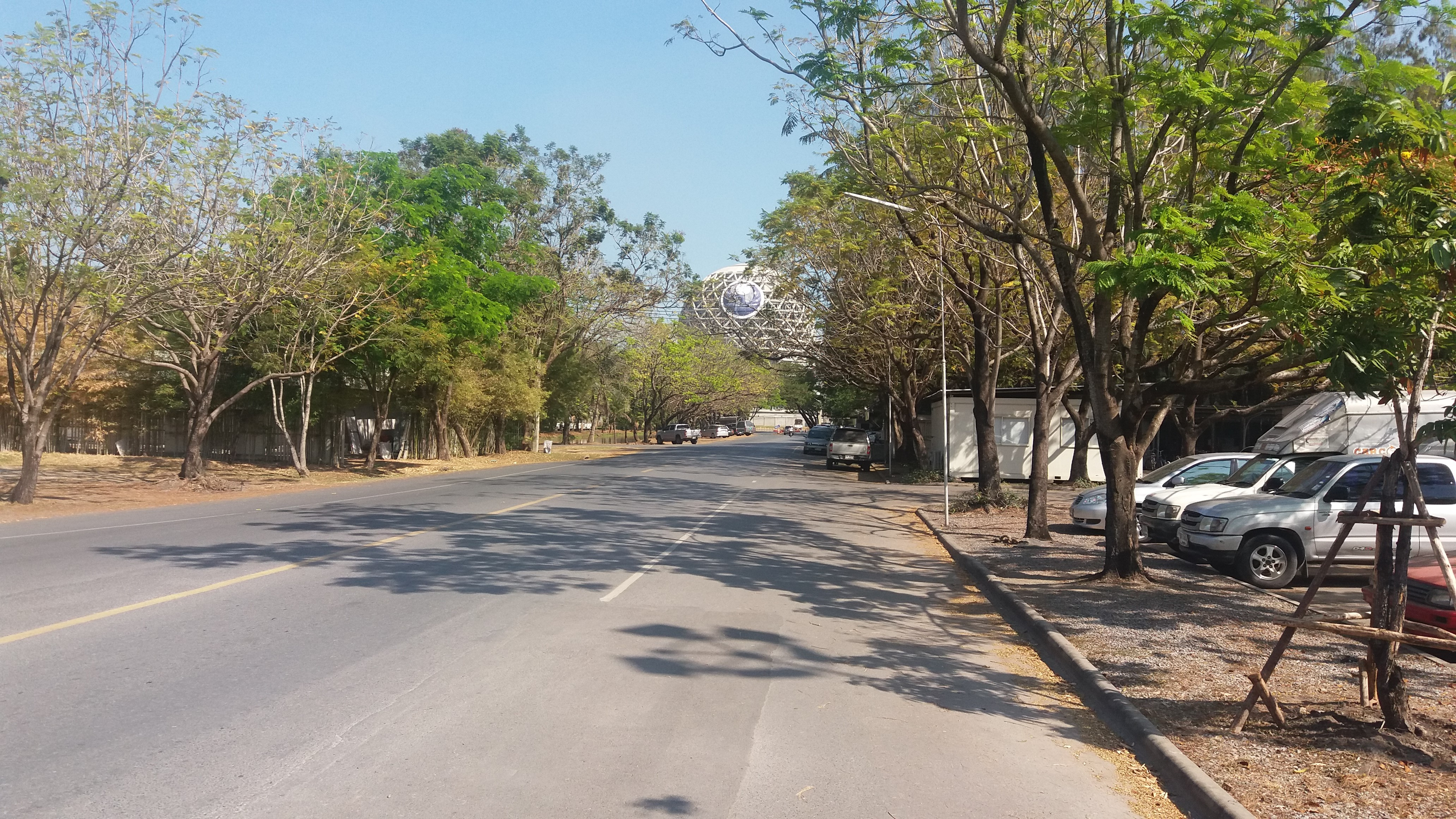
A street running up to the office buildings at Wat Phra Dhammakaya

- The Master Nun Chand Khonnokyoong Centennial Building: Built in 2017, this building is a 15-storey spherical structure serving as the headquarters of the Dhammakaya Foundation. It also functions as a center for Pali education, meditation training, administrative activities, and international meetings. The building's spherical design symbolizes the Dhammakaya sphere, representing the inner attainment in meditation. It is constructed with self-compacting concrete and includes energy-efficient features such as a closed-loop water cooling system.

Besides these, in the World Dhammakaya Center there are also more office buildings, a medical center, kutis for the sāmaṇera, a computer center and a broadcast center for the satellite television channel and radio channel. The construction layout of the World Dhammakaya Center has been compared with that of Wat Mahadhatu, in that the layout reflects the cosmological order and the idea of the nation.

It is the intention of Wat Phra Dhammakaya to develop the World Dhammakaya Center into a meeting-place and pilgrimage place for Buddhists from all over the world, just as Vatican City is for Christians and Mecca is for Muslims.

== In the media ==
Wat Phra Dhammakaya was the subject of the 2019 Thai documentary Come and See. The 84-minute film included extensive interviews with both supporters and critics of Wat Phra Dhammakaya regarding its teachings and practices, and chronicled the events of the 23-day lockdown of the temple by the Thai military junta in 2017. The film received critical acclaim as a type of long-form journalism that presented a wide range of views and provided a unique investigation into the temple and its alleged controversies that differed from what was seen in mainstream media reports. The film premiered in 2019 at the Busan International Film Festival in South Korea, but was banned in Thailand by Thai media censors. The ban on the film was lifted after two years, with the film premiering in Thai theaters in April 2021 and being made available on Thai Netflix in August of the same year. The filmmaker expressed surprise for the film's approval, given the behavior of the Thai military regime toward the temple in the past. News analysts described the film's approval as a possible attempt by Thailand's military-backed government to moderate its image in the wake of the 2020-2022 Thai Protests.

== See also ==
- Suppression of monasteries
