= Buddhism in Thailand =

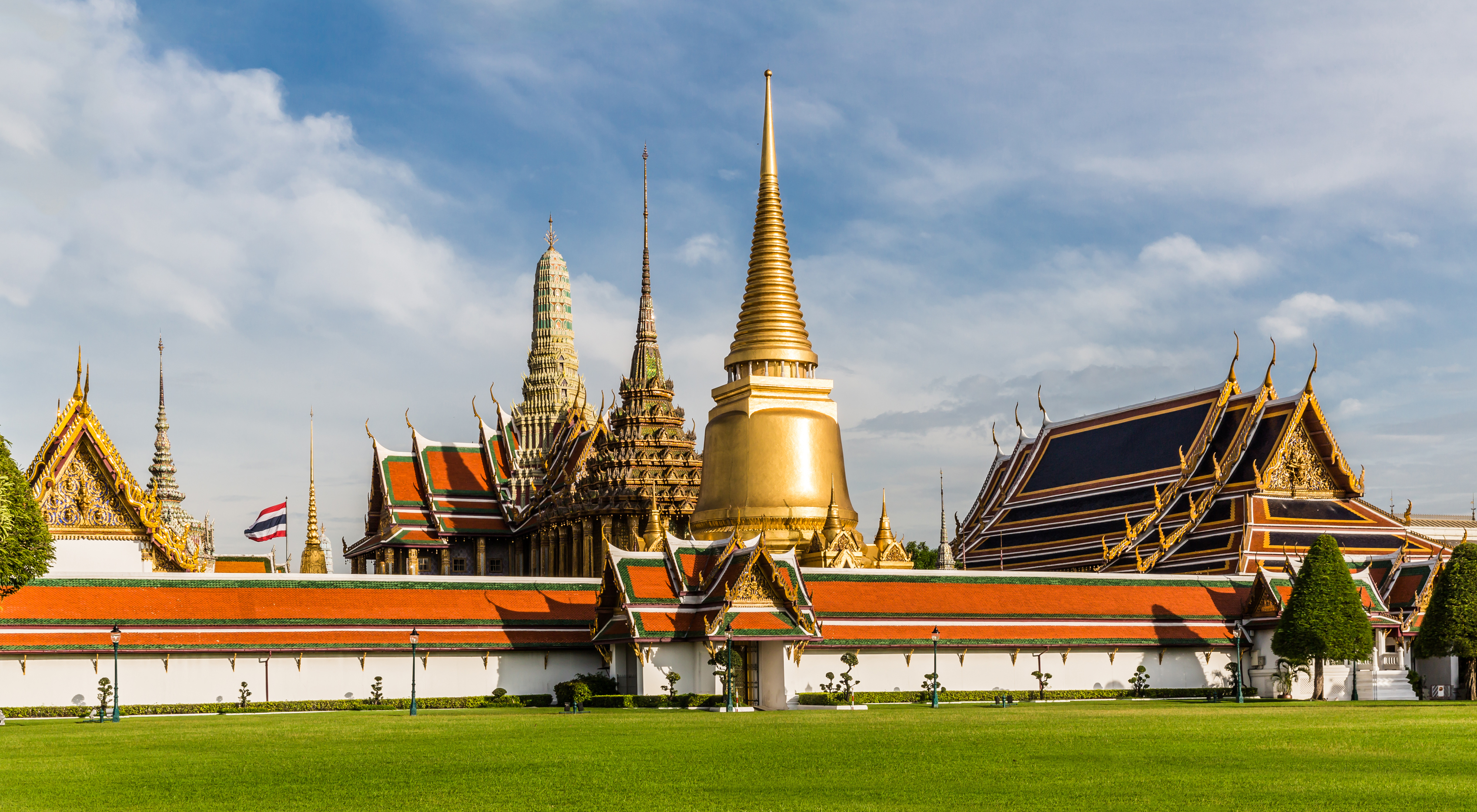
- Wat Phra Kaew, one of the most sacred wats in Bangkok

Total population
- c. 68 million (94.4%) in 2020

Regions with significant populations
- Throughout Thailand

Religions
- Theravada Buddhism

Languages
- Thai and other languages

Buddhism is the largest-religion in Thailand, followed by around 92.5% of the country's population as per 2021. By sheer numbers, it has the world's largest Buddhist population followed by China and Myanmar, with more than 67 million Buddhists. The Theravada branch is practiced by most Buddhists and shares many similarities with Sri Lankan Buddhism. Buddhism in Thailand has also become integrated with Hinduism from millennia of Indian influence, and Chinese religions from the large Thai Chinese population. Buddhist temples in Thailand are characterized by tall golden stupas, and the Buddhist architecture of Thailand is similar to that in other Southeast Asian countries, particularly Cambodia and Laos, with which Thailand shares cultural and historical heritages. Thailand, Cambodia, Myanmar, Sri Lanka and Laos are countries with Theravada Buddhist majorities.

Buddhism is believed to have come to what is now Thailand as early as the 3rd century BCE, in the time of the Indian Emperor Ashoka. Since then, Buddhism has played a significant role in Thai culture and society. Buddhism and the Thai monarchy have often been intertwined, with Thai kings historically seen as the main patrons of Buddhism in Thailand. Although politics and religion were generally separated for most of Thai history, Buddhism's connection to the Thai state would increase in the middle of the 19th century following the reforms of King Mongkut that would lead to the development of a royally-backed sect of Buddhism and increased centralization of the Thai sangha under the state, with state control over Buddhism increasing further after the 2014 coup d'état.

Thai Buddhism is distinguished for its emphasis on short-term ordination for every Thai man and its close interconnection with the Thai state and Thai culture. The two official branches, or Nikayas, of Thai Buddhism are the royally backed Dhammayuttika Nikaya and the larger Maha Nikaya.

== Pre-modern History ==
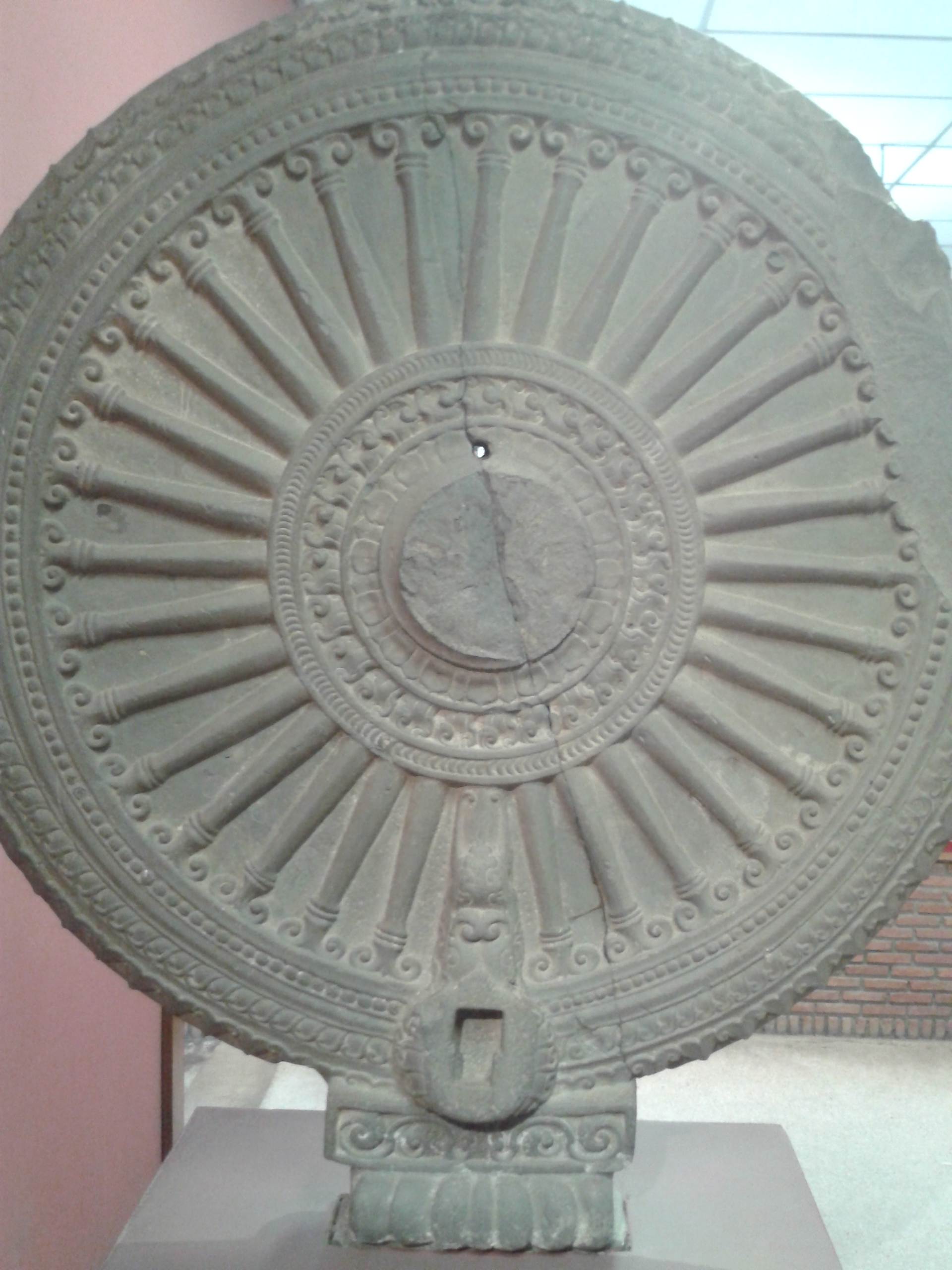
Dvaravati period stone dharma wheel, Phra Pathom Chedi National Museum

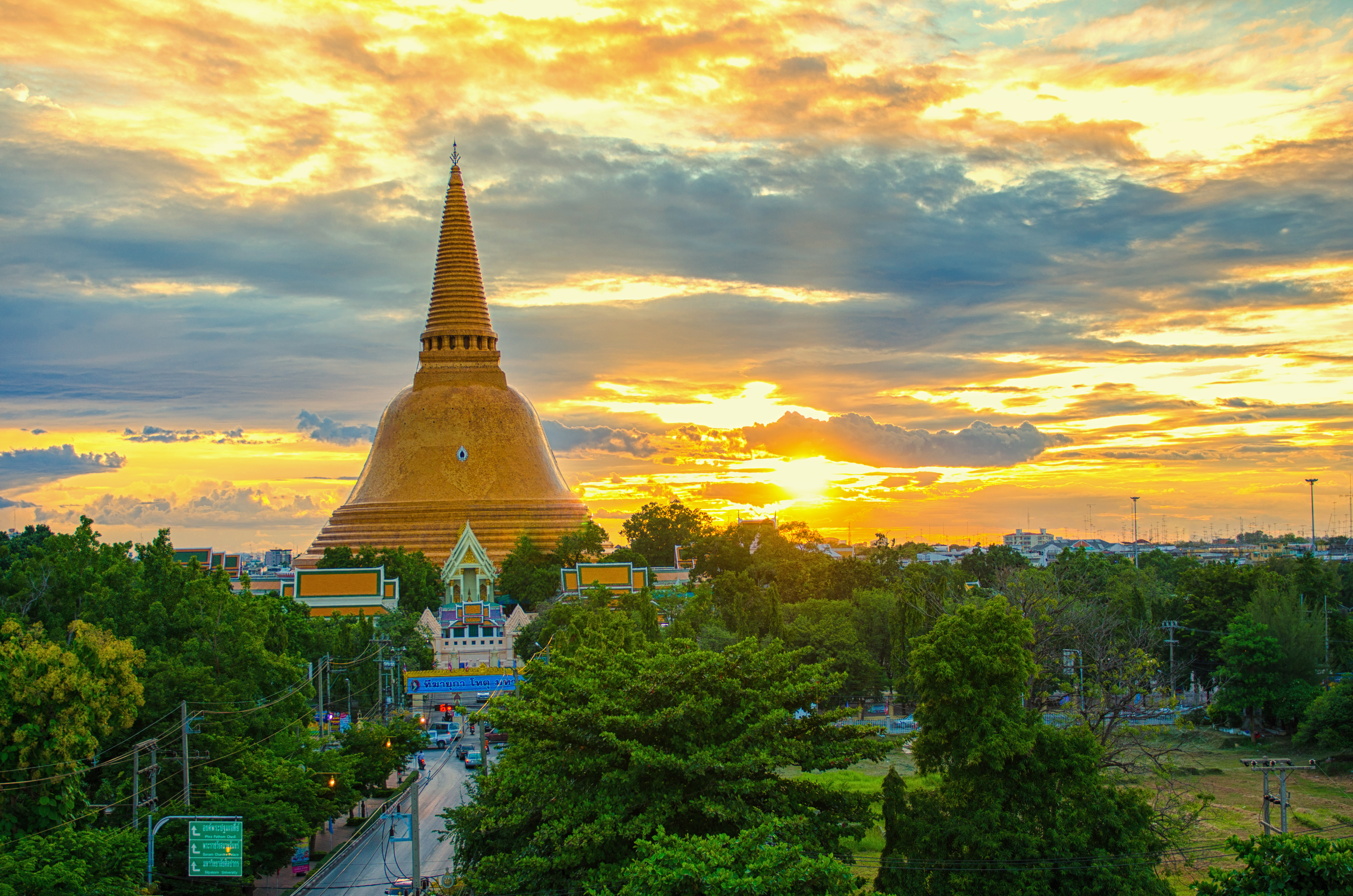
Phra Pathom Chedi, one of the earliest Buddhist stupas in Thailand, possibly dating to the time of the Ashokan missions

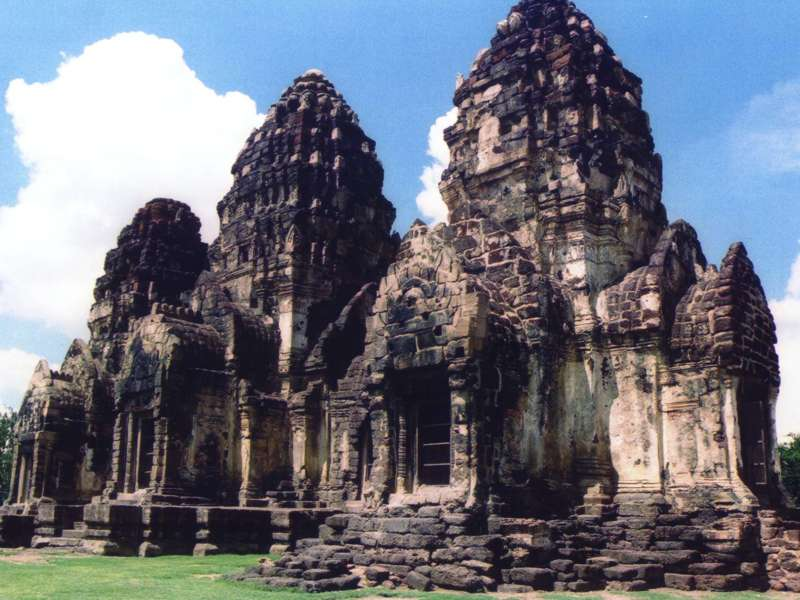
Prang Sam Yot, a Khmer Mahayana Temple in Lopburi, constructed during the reign of Jayavarman VII (c.1181–1218)

=== Buddhism in the pre-Thai kingdoms ===
The Mahāvaṃsa, a historical chronicle of Sri Lanka, mentions that during the reign of Ashoka (c. 268 to 232 BCE), monks Sona Thera and Uttara Thera were sent to spread Buddhism to Suvannabhumi, which is somewhere in Southeast Asia. Thai scholars believe that the Mon kingdom of Dvaravati (c. 6th to the 11th century) is likely to have received Buddhist missionaries during this era. This is because numerous archeological finds in the ancient Dvaravati cities like Nakon Pathom point to an early Buddhist presence. These finds include Dharma wheels, Buddha footprints, crouching deer and Pali inscriptions. Thus, Dvaravati Buddhism was probably an Indian form of Theravada (or at least a non-Mahayana) Buddhism. The Dvaravati style has been compared to the Amaravati style and may be influenced by it. It has been suggested that the original structure of the ancient Phra Pathom Stupa (which has been covered by restorations and a spire that was added later) was of similar design to the Stupa of Sanchi.

Later finds at Nakon Pathom and nearby cities also include Buddha images in the Gupta style. The spread of Buddhism in Southeast Asia may have arrived with merchant ships traveling the key maritime trade routes with India.

Various Southeast Asian kingdoms that ruled over parts of modern Thailand, such as the Khmer Empire (c. 802–1431 CE) and the Mon Lavo Kingdom (c. 450–1388 CE), were influenced by Indian Buddhist trends, which included Mahāyāna Buddhism and the Sanskrit Buddhist tradition.

The Mon Kingdom of Hariphunchai with its capital at Lamphun was also a Buddhist realm, with famous temples like Wat Haripunchai (1040) and Wat Chamadevi (1218).

The religious arts of the Indonesian Kingdom of Srivijaya (c. 650–1377), which controlled part of Southern Thailand, depict numerous figures from Indian Mahāyāna. Archeological finds in Southern Thailand (such as at Phra Phim and Nakon Sri Thammaraj) attest to the practice of Mahāyāna Buddhism in this region.

Starting at around the 11th century, Sinhalese Theravada monks gradually led the conversion of most of Southeast Asia to the Sinhalese Mahavihara sect of Theravāda. This was supported by powerful Southeast Asian kings, such as the Burmese Anawratha (1044–1077), who promoted Theravada throughout the Bagan Kingdom, which included parts of Thailand that he conquered.

=== The first Thai states: Sukhothai and Lan Na ===
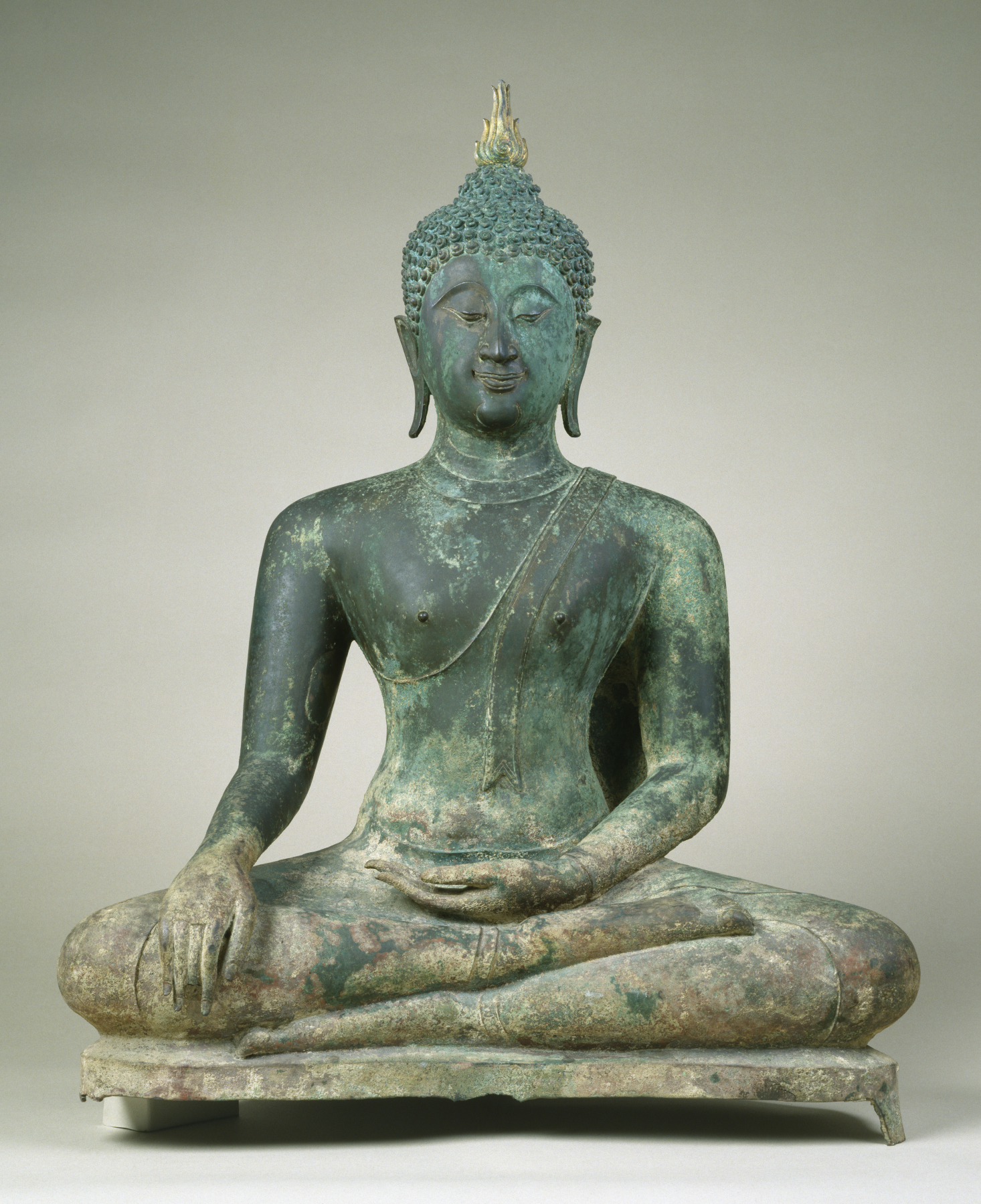
Seated Sukhothai Buddha, The Walters Art Museum

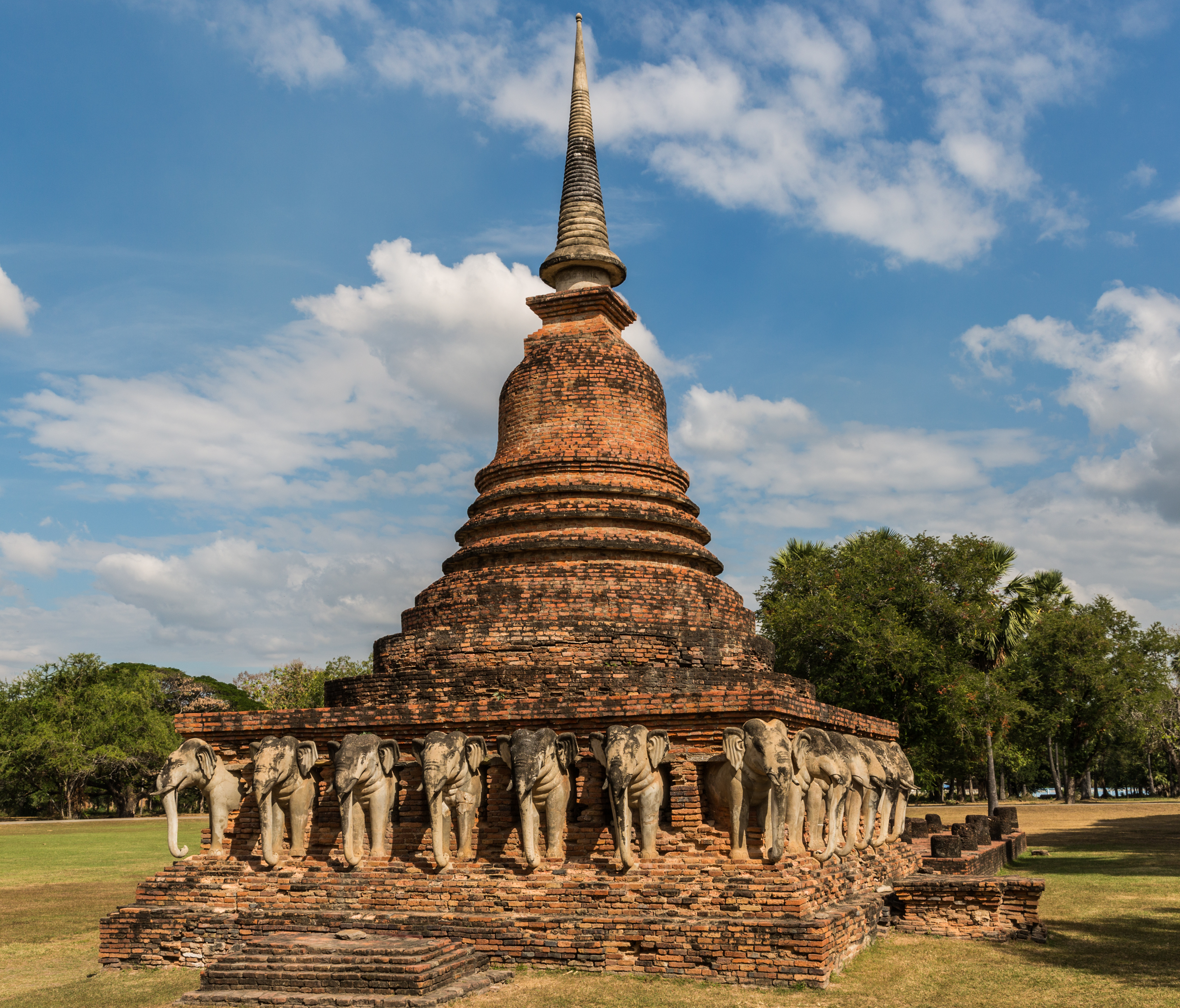
Stupa in the Sukhothai period Wat Sorasak

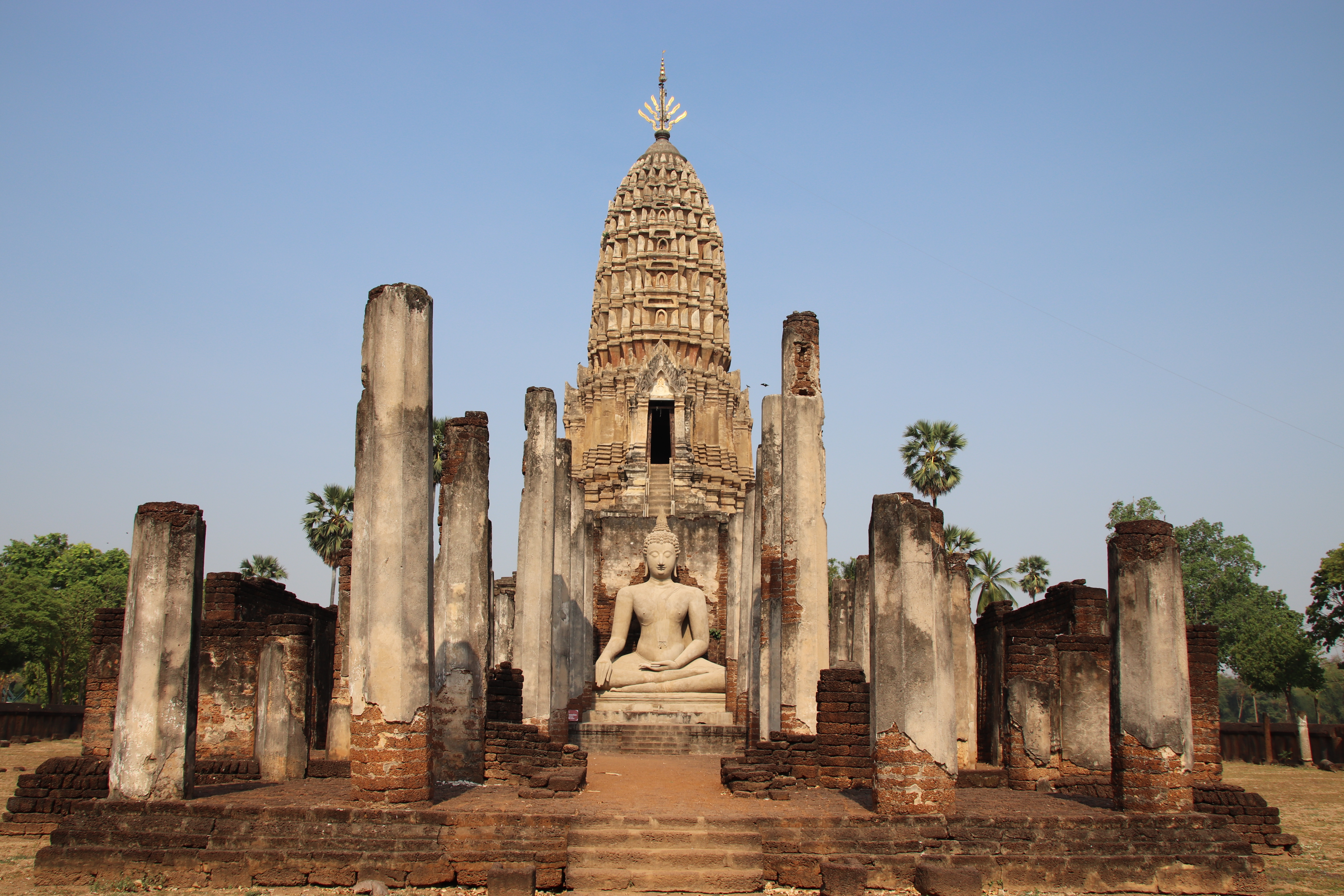
Si Satchanalai Historical Park

Beginning in the 7th century, Thai people gradually migrated from China to Southeast Asia. They eventually began conquering Southeast Asian kingdoms like Hariphunchai and adopting the practice of Buddhism which had existed in the conquered regions. The first ethnic Thai kingdom was the Sukhothai Kingdom (13th-15th century), which was founded in 1238. At first, both Theravāda and Mahāyāna were practiced in this new Thai realm, as well as Khmer Brahmanism.

During the 13th century, Thai monks traveled to Sri Lanka to ordain in the Sinhalese Mahavihara Theravada sect (known as Lankavamsa/Lankavong in Thailand) lineage and to study the teachings. Lankavong monks also traveled to Thailand to teach Theravada Buddhism. Archeological evidence suggests that the most active region for the initial spread of Sinhalese Theravada was at Nakon Sri Thammarath (in South Thailand).

King Ram Khamhaeng (fl. late 13th century) gave royal support to the Lankavong Theravāda monks in Nakon Sri Thammarath. He invited them to his capital, built monasteries for them, and subsequently sent more monks to Sri Lanka to study. This royal support increased the prestige and influence of Theravāda in Thailand. During Ram Khamhaeng's reign, stupas were built, reflecting the Sri Lankan influence. One of these is Wat Chang Lom. Thai travelers to Sri Lanka also brought back the root of a Bodhi tree, under which the Buddha attained enlightenment, which began the Thai tradition of venerating Bodhi trees. Sukhothai style Buddha statues also reflect Sri Lankan art styles.

Under the reign of Ram Khamhaeng, the position of sangharaja (leader of the monastic community) was created and tasked with the administration of the sangha, the orders of monks and nuns. Other monks were also given lower-level administrative positions.

Later Sukhothai kings would continue this policy of supporting Lankavong Theravāda, and numerous monasteries, Buddha images and stupas were built during the Sukhothai period. The study of Pali Buddhist texts was also promoted. Thai kings also inherited the concept of Buddhist kingship from the tradition. This was based on the idea that the Buddhist "Dhamma king" ruled in conformity with the Dhamma (the universal law and the Buddha's teaching which points to it), particularly the ten kingly virtues mentioned in the Aggañña Sutta, which include giving alms, morality, liberality, gentleness, non-anger, and non-harming.

Mahathammaracha I (r. 1346–1368) was a Sukhothai king known as a great scholar and patron of Buddhism, who even became a monk for a brief period of four months. A treatise on Buddhist cosmology, the Tribhumikatha (Trai Phum Phra Ruang, "The Three Worlds According to King Ruang"), has been attributed to him, and is one of the oldest traditional works of Thai literature. During the reign of Mahathammaracha I, another group of monks arrived from Sri Lanka, led by Somdet Phra Mahasami (Sumana), who was associated with a Sri Lankan forest monastery named Udumbaragiri.

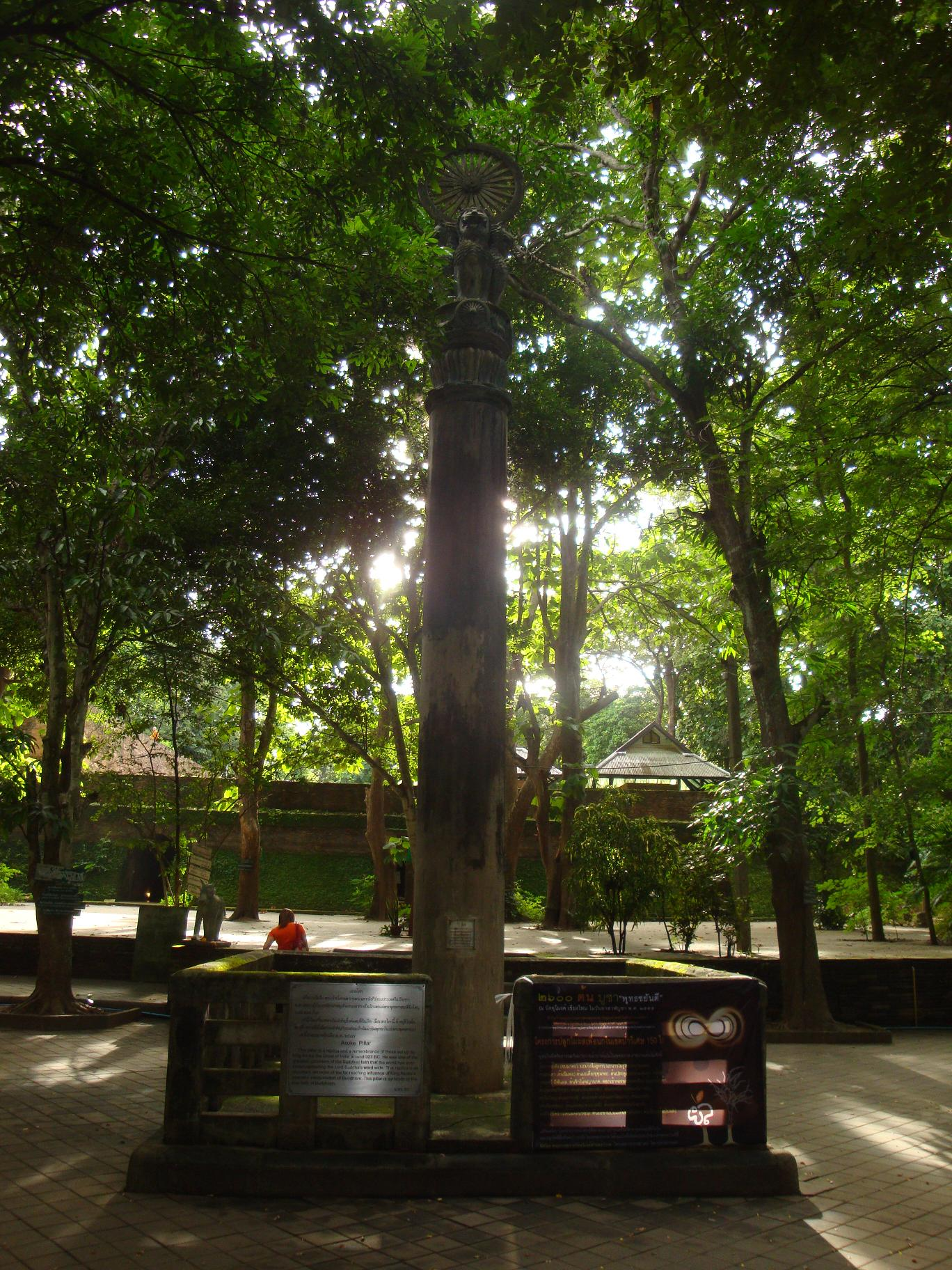
Replica of Ashok pillar at Wat Umong in Chiang Mai Province, Thailand, 13th century. Attributed to King Mangrai.

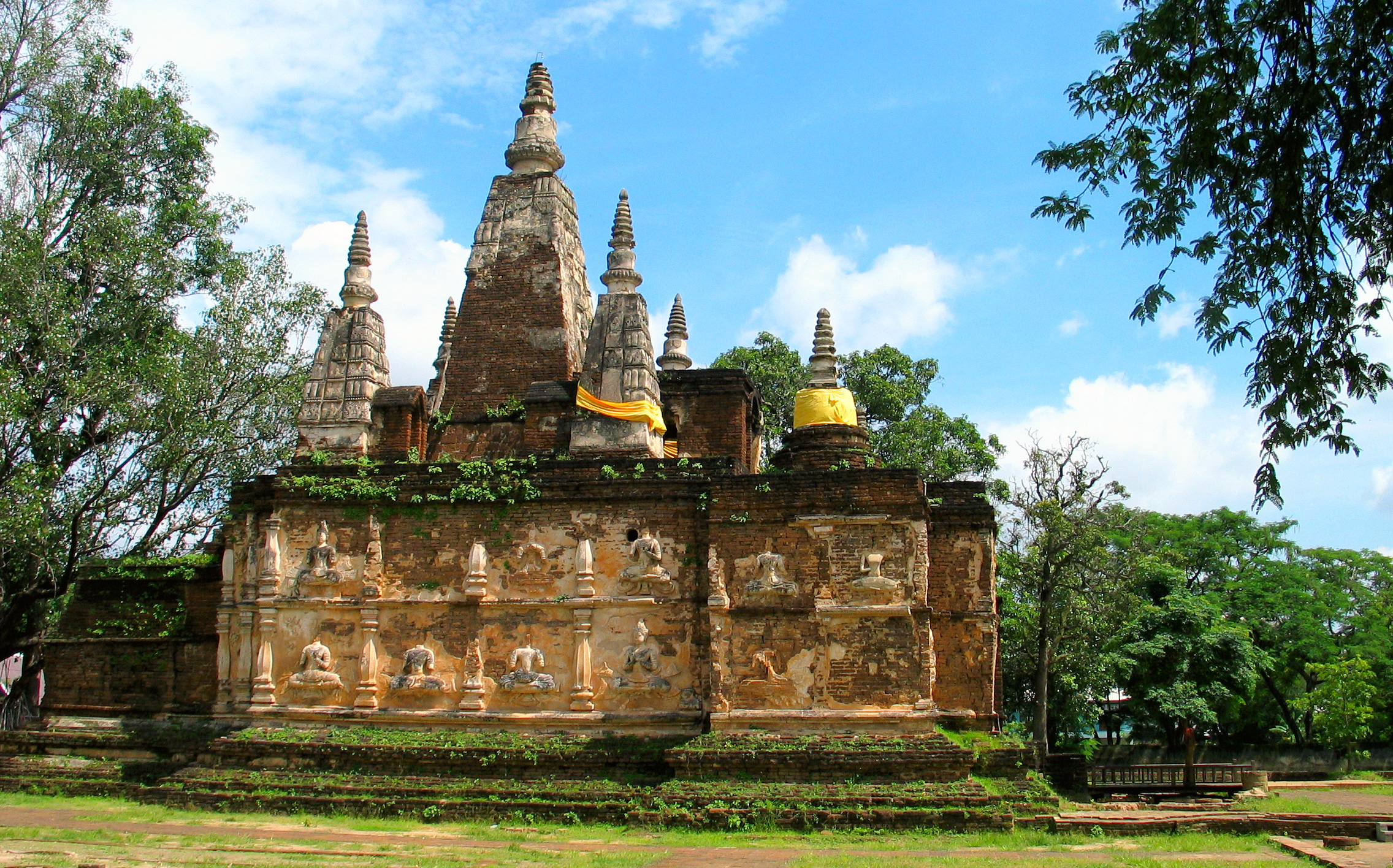
The Maha chedi of Wat Chet Yot

Further north, in the Thai Lan Na Kingdom (c. 1292–1775), Theravāda also flourished. Lan Na kings built unique wats (monasteries) which show a blend of Mon, Indian, Burmese and Khmer styles. Some important early Lan Na wats include Wat Ku Kham (Temple of the Golden Chedi, c. 1288) and Wat Chiang Man (c. 1297) both built by the first Lan Na king Mangrai (1238–1311).

King Pha Yu (r. 1345–1367), continued promoting Buddhism. He shifted the capital to Chiang Mai and built Wat Li Chiang. His successor, Keu Na (1367–1385), invited the forest monk Somdet Phra Mahasami to Lan Na to introduce his Sri Lankan forest sect. Mahasami arrived with relics which were enshrined at the newly built Wat Suan Dauk. This wat became the headquarters of the Sri Lankan forest sect. Wat Phra Singh (c. 1385) is another example of classic Buddhist architecture of the Lan Na kingdom.

In the reign of Sam Fang Kaen (1411–1442), a controversy broke out between the Sri Lankan sect of Somdet Phra Mahasami and another Sri Lankan order newly arrived from Ayutthya, which criticized the old order for accepting money and owning rice lands.

Sam Fang Kaen was deposed by Tilokaraj (r. 1441–1487), who placed his support behind the new, more rigorous forest sect and allowed it to become the dominant sect in the kingdom. He is known for building several monasteries for the new Buddhist order, including Wat Chet Yot and Wat Pa Daeng. The king also enlarged Wat Chedi Luang to house the Emerald Buddha. During his reign, in c. 1477, a Buddhist council convened to review the Pali Canon. It is considered the eighth Buddhist council in the Thai tradition.

Lan Na Buddhism reached its climax during the reign of Tilokaraja's grandson, Phra Mueang Kaeo (1495–1528). His reign saw great achievements in Pali literature, as attested by works like the Jinakalamali (a historical chronicle, c. 1517), and the great commentary, Mangalatthadipani.

Even though Theravada was now becoming the dominant form of Buddhism in Thailand during this era, Mahayana and Brahmanism also continued to be practiced.

=== Ayutthya period (1351–1767) ===
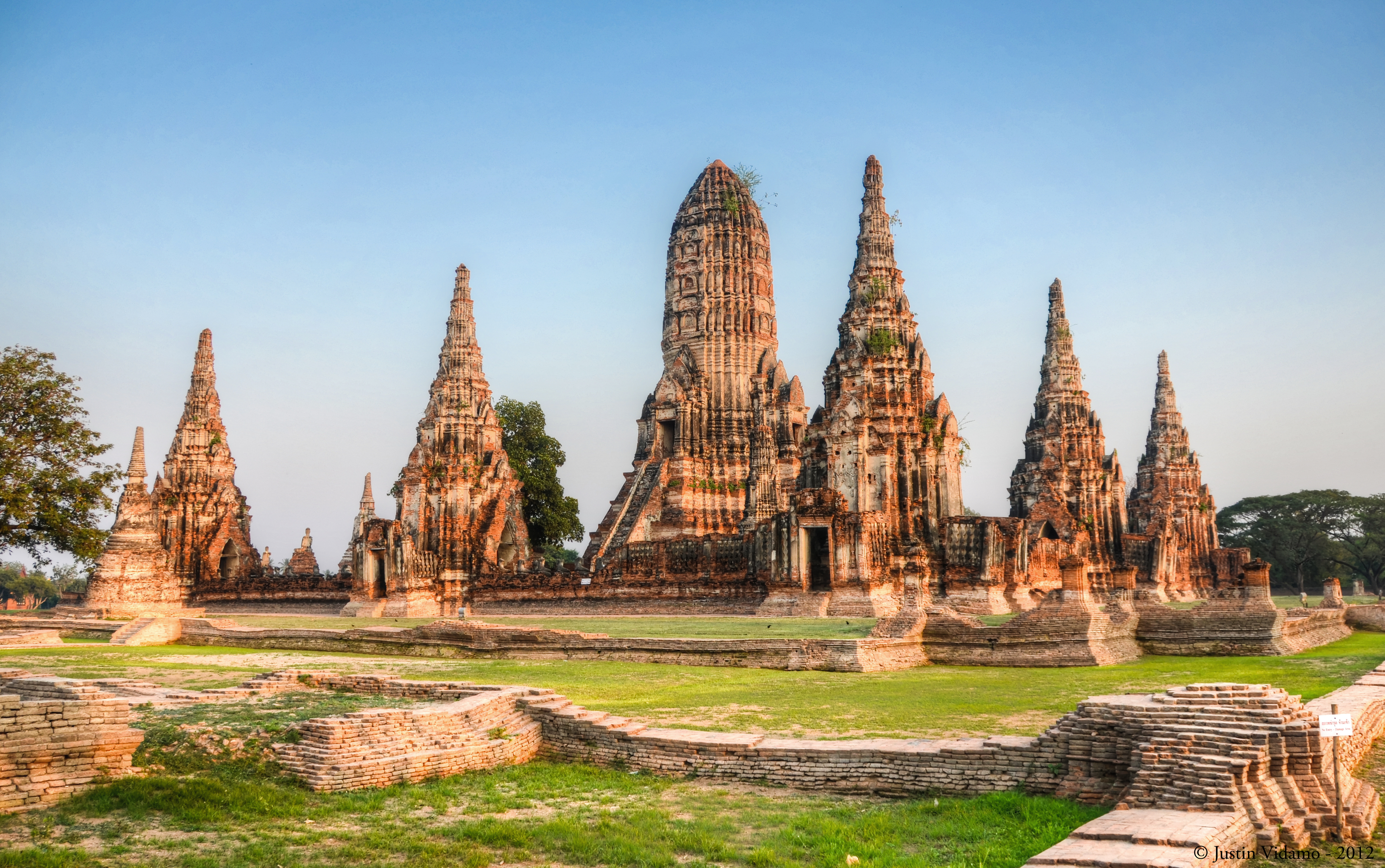
Wat Chaiwatthanaram

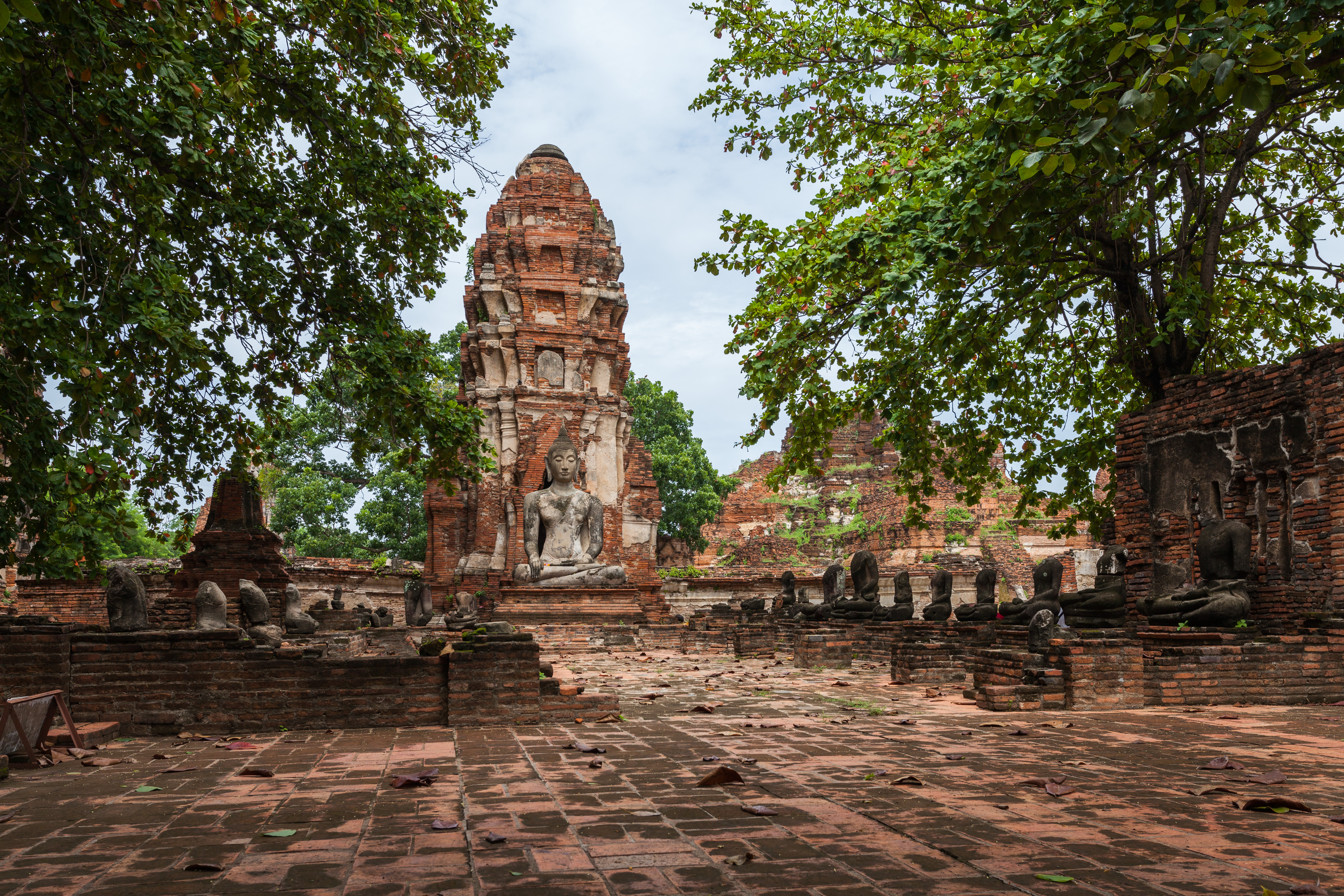
Prang and statue of Buddha, Wat Mahathat, Ayutthaya

During the 14th century, Thai power shifted south with the founding of the Kingdom of Ayutthya by King Uthong (r. 1351–1369). Its capital of Ayutthya was a major center of Buddhism, with many temples and monasteries. There, Buddhist culture adopted both Sukhothai and Khmer elements.

Ayutthya kings continued to focus their royal patronage on the Lankavong Theravada sect. They saw themselves as defenders of the religion, which they advanced by supporting the sangha. During the reign of Indraraja I (c. 1422), a new sect of Sri Lankan Theravada, the Vanaratnavong (a.k.a. Pa-Kaeo) sect, was formed by a group of Thai monks who had ordained in Sri Lanka. It mainly differed from the older Lankavong sect in that it was stricter in its practice.

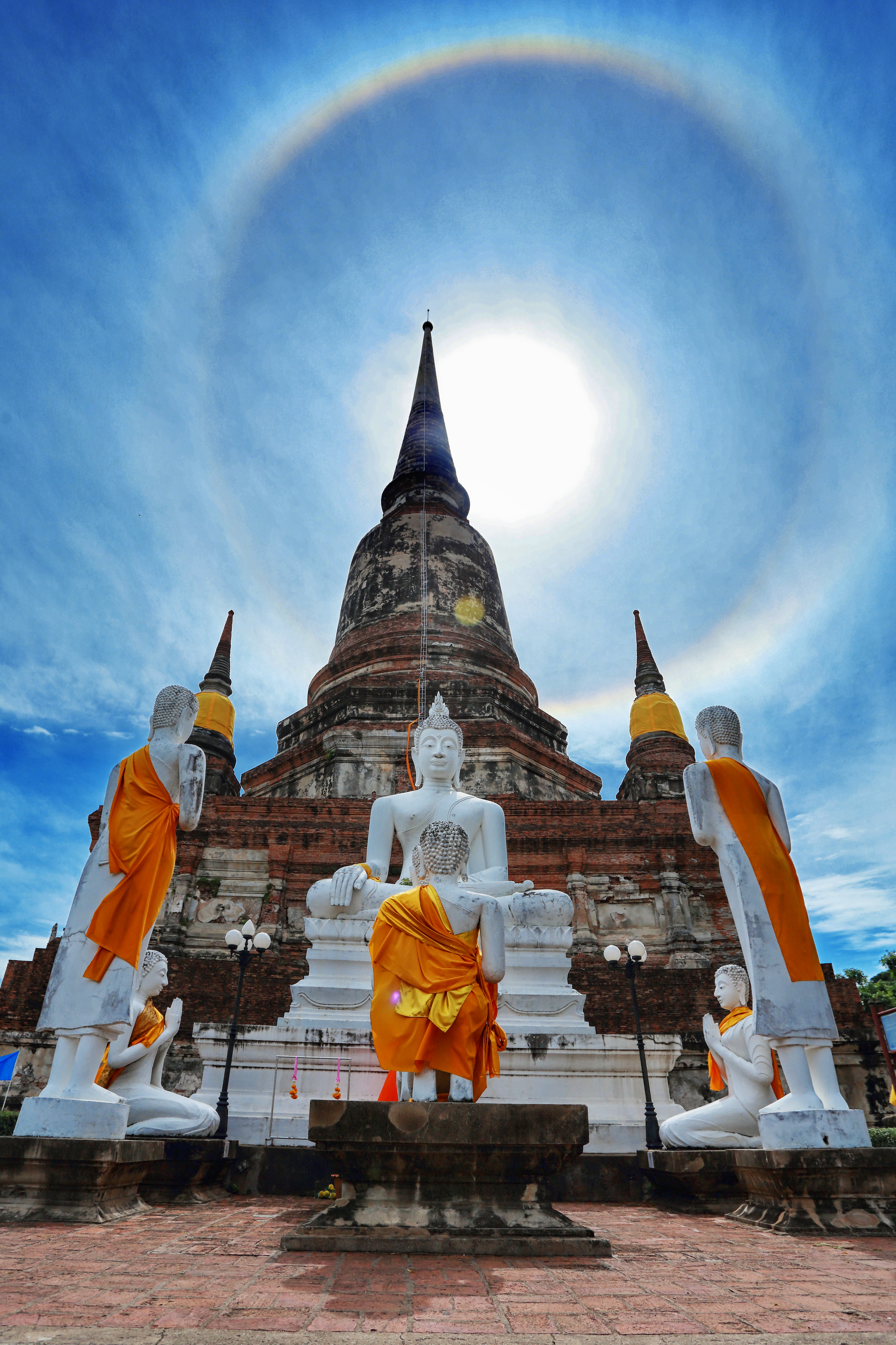
Chedi of Wat Yai Chai Mongkhon, built by King Naresuan the Great in 1592

The reign of king Borommatrailokkanat (1431–1488) was a golden era for Thai Buddhism. He encouraged the arts and literature, as well as building numerous monasteries in Ayutthya. He also ordained as monk for eight months at Wat Chulamani. During his reign, the Vanaratnavong group also grew in prominence. A major literary work of this era is the Mahachat Kham Luang (Thai: มหาชาติคำหลวง), an epic poem of the "Great Birth" of Vessantara Bodhisattva, which combined Pali verse with Thai poetry. To this day, the Vessantara Jātaka is one of the most popular stories of one of Gautama Buddha's past lives. It tells the story of a very compassionate and generous prince, Vessantara, who gives away everything he owns.

During the late 17th century, French visitors described a state examination system under King Narai that was administered to Buddhist monks to test their knowledge in the Pali language and in Buddhist doctrine. Those who could not pass were released from their monastic vows and returned to lay life. Those who excelled achieved high social status and officially recognized ranks (barian).

Another later influential king was Boromakot (r. 1733–1758), who ruled during a peaceful time and was a great patron of Buddhism, founding numerous temples. During his reign, Thailand sent 25 monks to Sri Lanka to re-establish higher ordination (which had been lost due to warfare on the island). The Thai monks helped found the Siam Nikaya, which remains one of the main monastic orders in Sri Lanka to this day.

Numerous major Thai literary compositions were composed during the late Ayutthya era. One of these is The Legend of Phra Malai (Thai: พระมาลัยคำหลวง), a Buddhist epic composed by Prince Thammathibet in 1737. Other Buddhist pieces from this era include the Sue-ko Kham Chan (Thai: เสือโคคำฉันท์, c. 1657) and the Samutta-Kōt Kham Chan (Thai: สมุทรโฆษคำฉันท์, c. 1657) by Phra Maha Raja-Kru. Both are kham chan poems based on the Paññāsa Jātaka.

Though Ayutthya's main religion remained as Theravada Buddhism throughout its history, many elements of the political and social system were incorporated from Hindu traditions and numerous rites were conducted by Brahmins. The kingdom was also home to religious minorities practicing Mahayana Buddhism, Islam and Catholicism.

Though we know little of the practices of the Theravada forest monks during the Ayutthya period, it is possible that at this time monks were developing esoteric practices similar to those found in a later Sinhalese work called the Yogāvacara's manual. These esoteric Theravada practices would produce a tradition called Southern Esoteric Buddhism, also known as Borān kammaṭṭhāna ('ancient practices').

This esoteric Theravada tradition remained a mainstream Buddhist tradition in Cambodia, Laos and Thailand well into the modern era. An inscription from northern Thailand with esoteric elements has been dated to the Sukhothai Kingdom of the 16th century. Kate Crosby notes that this attestation makes the southern esoteric tradition earlier than "any other living meditation tradition in the contemporary Theravada world."

Furthermore, numerous pre-Buddhist animist practices called Satsana Phi continued to be performed by Thais. Phi (Thai: ผี) are spirits of buildings or territories, natural places, or phenomena; they are also ancestral spirits that protect people, and can also include malevolent spirits. The phi, which are guardian deities of places or towns, are celebrated at festivals with communal gatherings and offerings of food. They are an important part of Thai folklore and local folk religion.

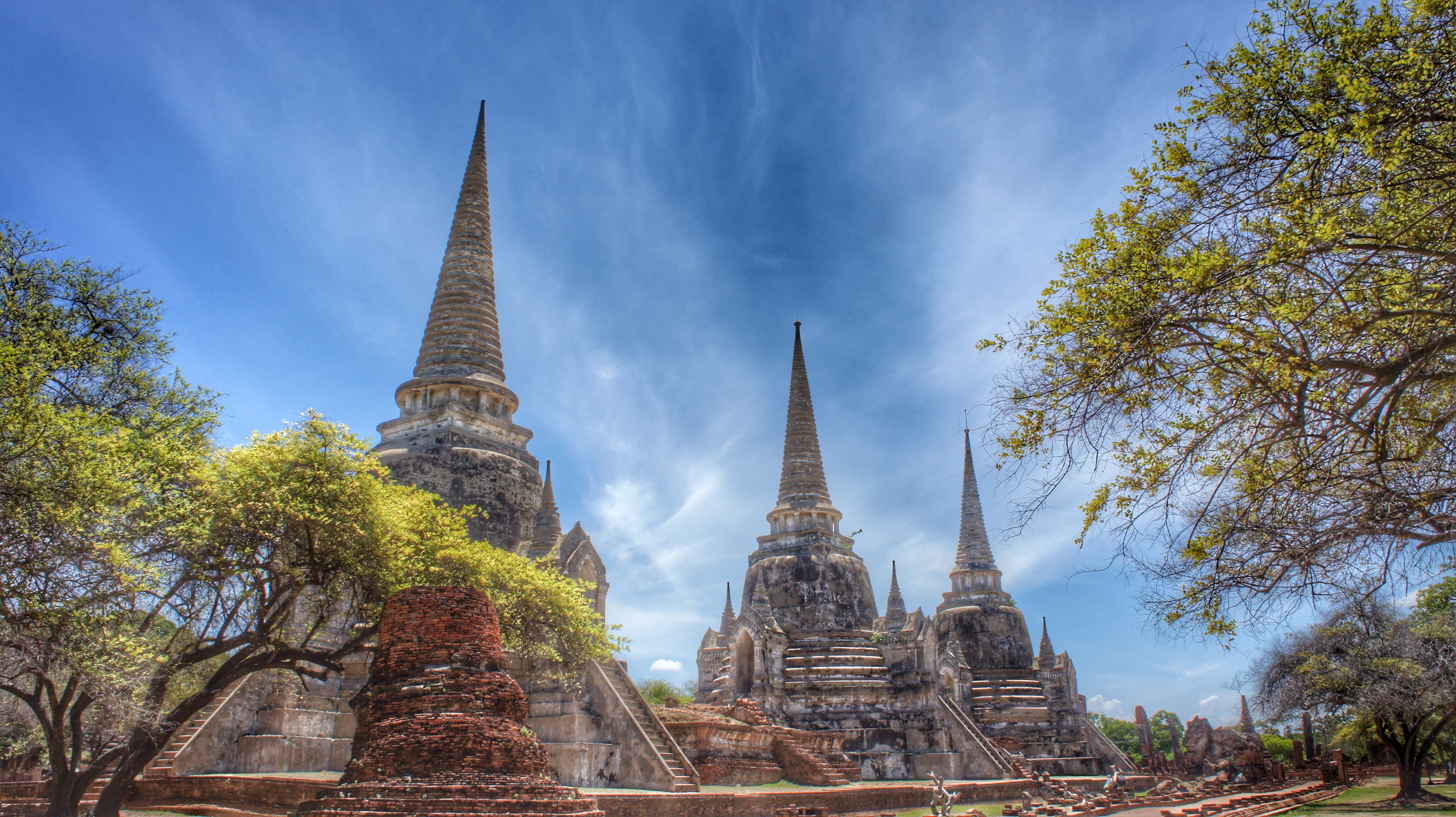
Wat Phra Si Sanphet

From the 16th to 19th centuries, there were numerous wars between Thailand and Burma. The Thai capital was destroyed in 1767, leading to the loss of numerous historical records, literary and religious texts and marking the fall of the Ayutthya kingdom proper. As such, there is scant historical information about Thai religion during this period.

Anthropologist-historian S. J. Tambiah has suggested a general pattern for that era, at least with respect to the relations between Buddhism and the sangha on the one hand and the king on the other hand. In Thailand, as in other Theravada Buddhist kingdoms, the king was in principle thought of as a patron and protector of the religion (sasana) and the sangha, while sasana ( teaching, practice, discipline and doctrine) and the Sangha were considered in turn the treasures of the polity and the signs of its legitimacy. Religion and polity, however, remained separate domains, and in ordinary times the organizational links between the Sangha and the king were not close.

After the fall of Ayutthya, Thailand was reunited by King Taksin under the Kingdom of Thonburi, but he was overthrown in 1782 by Rama I.

== Modern history ==
=== Early Rattanakosin period (1782–1851) ===
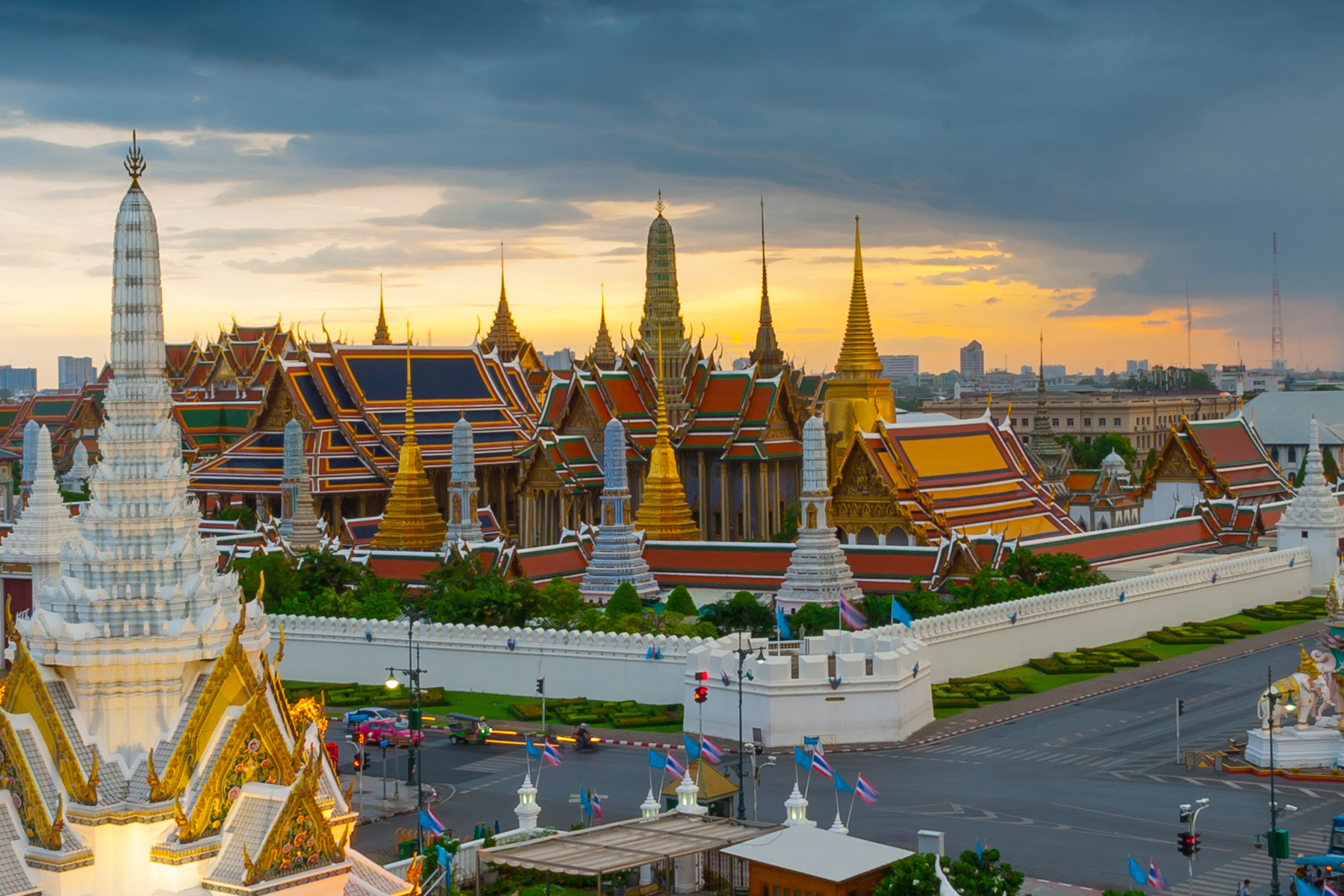
The Wat Phra Kaew Royal Temple complex viewed from outside the walls of the Grand Palace, Bangkok

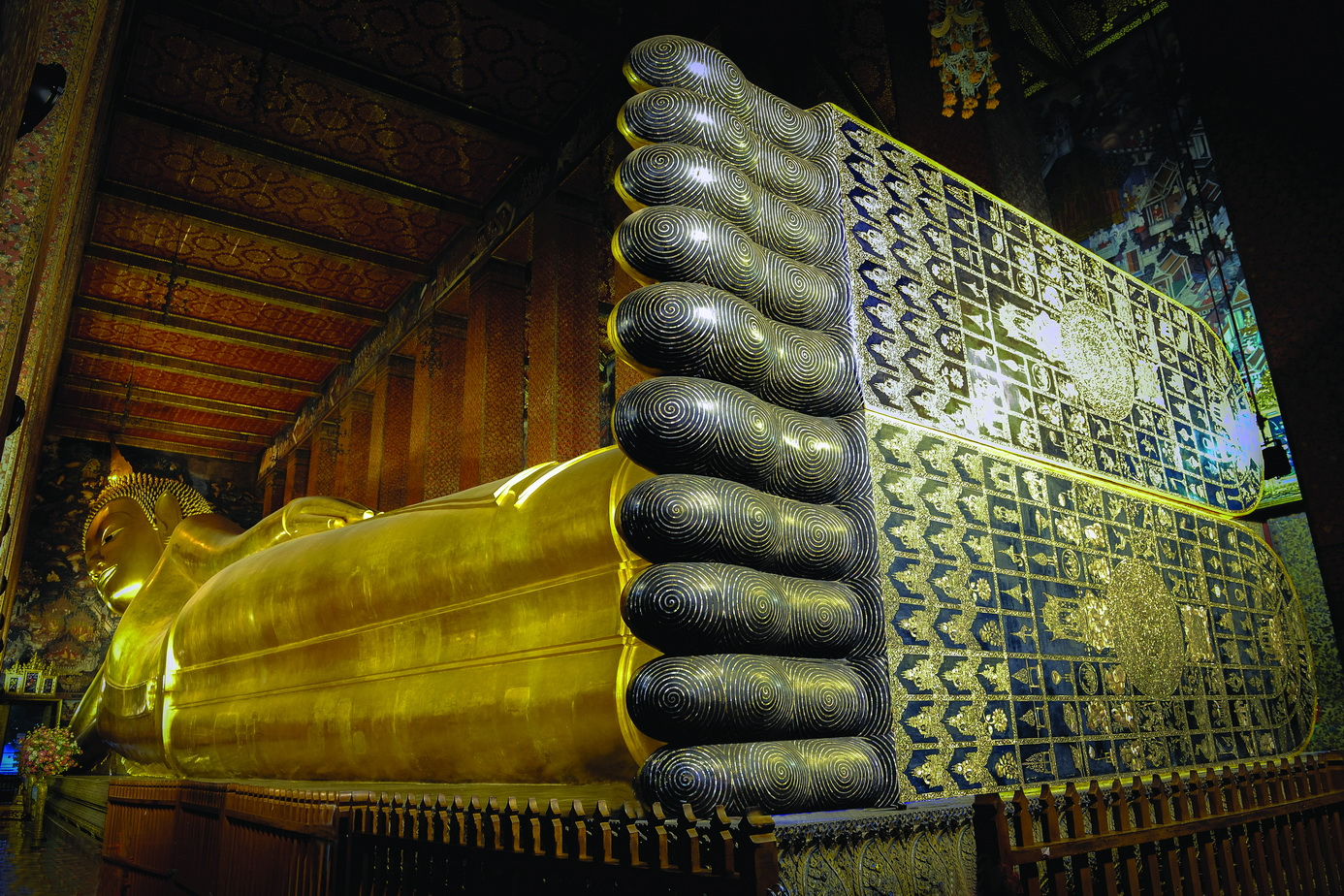
Reclining Buddha at Wat Pho

Rama I (reigned 1782–1809) of the Chakri Dynasty (which remains the current royal family of Thailand) founded the Rattanakosin Kingdom. Under Rama I, new temples were constructed at the new capital of Rattanakosin (modern Bangkok), such as the royal wat, Wat Phra Kaew, where the Emerald Buddha is enshrined.

Rama I also appointed the first Supreme Patriarch of Thai Buddhism which has the authority to oversee the Thai Buddhist sangha. Rama I also encouraged the translation of ancient Pali Buddhist texts. Furthermore, under Rama I, the Buddhist canon (Pāli Canon) was collected and reviewed within the framework of another Buddhist Council (which is known as the 9th council as per the Thai tradition). It was attended by over 250 monks. A new edition of the Pali Canon was published, the Tipitaka Chabab Tongyai. Rama I also issued several royal decrees which governed the conduct of monastics. Furthermore, Pali examinations for monastics were revived under the auspices of the supreme patriarch Somdet Phra Sangkarat (1793–1816), which covered the oral translation of Pali Canon passages from Pali to Thai.

Under Rama I, some new laws overseeing the Buddhist sangha were passed. Every abbot was required to prepare a register of the monks and novices under them. Furthermore, the king decreed that every monk had to carry a document of identification. Furthermore, the state reserved the right to defrock monks who were not following the monastic rules. 128 corrupt monks were known to have been defrocked.

Rama II established a new modern ecclesiastical education system for studying Theravada doctrine and the Pali language. This examination system was further revised with nine grades of exams. It remains the standard up to this day. Rama II also sent various missions to Sri Lanka to spread the teaching, since he feared that, under British rule, it would begin to decline there.

The third Chakri monarch, Rama III (reigned 1824–1851), was also a devout Buddhist. More than 50 temples were built and repaired in his reign. These include the first Chinese style temple at Rajorasa, the stupa at Wat Arun, the Golden Mount at Wat Sraket, the Metal Temple at Wat Ratchanadda, and Wat Pho, the site of the first university in Thailand.

=== Early 20th century: The reform era ===
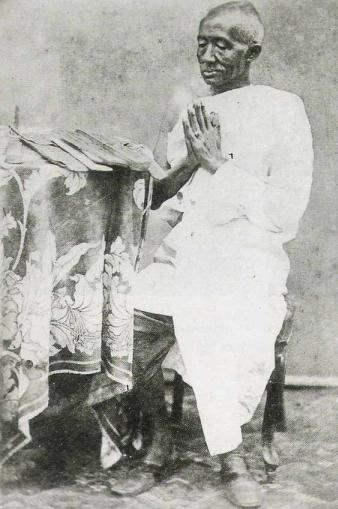
From 1824 to 1851, Mongkut spent his life as a monk.

In 1851, King Mongkut (r. 1851–1868) ascended the throne. He had been a monk himself for twenty-seven years and was a distinguished scholar of Buddhist scripture in the Pali language. He was also known for his study of western science and the humanities, having learned Latin and English. Mongkut had also spent his early monastic years at Wat Samorai, a forest monastery renowned for meditation and spiritual practices.

During Mongkut's monastic years, numerous monks immigrating from Burma introduced the more rigorous monastic discipline of the Mon sangha. Influenced by this and his own understanding of the Tipitaka, Prince Mongkut (as a monk) began a reform Buddhist movement by founding a new monastic order at Wat Samorai. This order was called the Dhammayuttika ("yoked to the Dhamma") Nikaya, which kept a stricter monastic discipline than the rest of the Thai sangha. Restrictions included not using money, not storing up food, and not taking milk in the evening.

The Dhammayuttika movement was characterized by an emphasis on the original Pali Canon and a rejection of some postcanonical Buddhist literature (including the Traibhumikatha). They also stressed the rationalism of Buddhism and tried to return to the way it was understood during early Buddhism before heterodox popular beliefs had transformed it.

As king, Mongkut promoted his religious reformation through the new Buddhist order and through state power. Dhammayuttika monks became the clerical vanguard of a movement promoting the king's form of Buddhist modernism, one that sought to modernize the religion by removing irrational folk beliefs and returning to the Pali Canon. Wat Bowonniwet Vihara in Bangkok became the administrative center of the Thammayut order and the center of Pali studies in Thailand.

During Mongkut's reign (1851–1868), the new order also spread into Laos and Cambodia, though it remained a minority sect in comparison to the larger Thai Mahanikaya order which represented over 90 percent of monks. King Mongkut also reorganized and tightened the organization of the Sangha by establishing a new administrative system. A 1859 law which he formulated included eleven articles, such as requiring the registration of all monastic residents in royal monasteries.

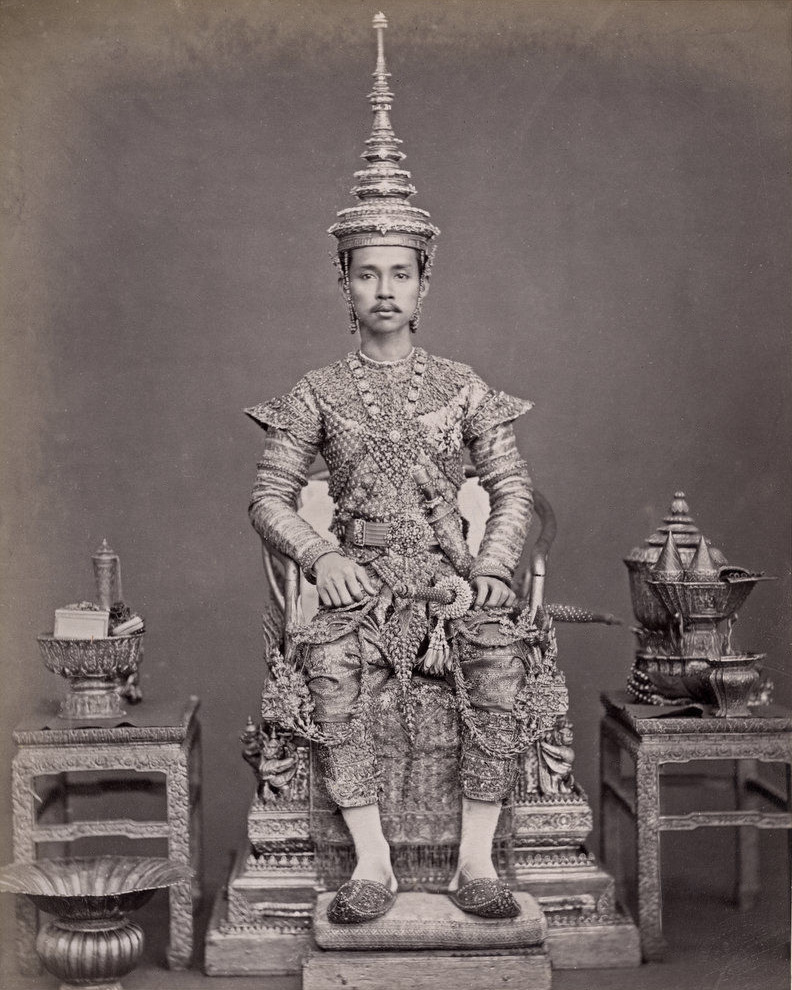
King Chulalongkorn's extensive Sangha Act of 1902 led to a more hierarchically organized and centrally controlled Thai sangha.

The administrative and sangha reforms that Mongkut started were continued by his successor, King Chulalongkorn (Rama V, 1868–1910) who made the new sangha hierarchy formal and permanent through the Sangha Law of 1902, which remains the foundation of Sangha administration throughout the history of modern Thailand (though the law has been amended numerous times).

The act divided the religious administration of the kingdom into four main divisions: north, south, center, and Dhammayutika Nikaya (with further subdivisions). Each division was assigned one patriarch who also had a deputy under him. All these elders together formed the Sangha Council of Elders (Pali: Mahāthera Samāgama), the highest body of the Thai Sangha. The act created a graduated bureaucracy of monastic leaders, from abbot, to leaders of regional sub-divisions, all the way up to the president of the council of elders. There were also posts for professors and instructors.

The act recognized three types of monasteries: royal, common, and monastic residences (which lack a sima, a consecrated border). A survey conducted in 1900 reported 7,206 monasteries in Thailand (with only 117 royal monasteries). Ultimate responsibility for each monastery was granted to the abbot, who could punish offenders, mediate disputes and grant or refuse residence. The Sangha Act also required monks be assigned to a monastery (vagrant monks not belonging to a monastery were arrested) and to carry identification documents when traveling away from their monastery. Also, any establishment of new monasteries had to be approved by the state (Article 9).

Aside from the need to reform the sangha's administration, the king and other Thais also felt that there was a need to standardize Buddhist doctrine and study. They addressed this in different ways. Prince Wachirayan Warorot (Pali: Vajirañāṇavarorasa, 1860–1921) wrote a basic textbook of Buddhist doctrine (the Nawakowat) which became a sort of Thai Buddhist catechism at the time and was promoted by the king. Rama V also promoted the publishing of the Pali Canon in Thai Script for the first time (c. 1893). He also founded Chulalongkorn University and the Mahāmakuṭa Royal Academy providing higher education in Buddhist doctrine along with secular subjects.

Prince Wachirayan Warorot, a leading Buddhist scholar of the modern era who revolutionized Thai Buddhist education

During the reign of king Rama VI (1910–1925), the king introduced the official use of the Buddhist Era dating system. The Thai Buddhist Era year of 2455 began on 1 April 1912. Prince Wachirayan Warorot (1860–1921) became the head of the Thammayut sect and the supreme patriarch of Thai Buddhism from 1910 to 1921. There were also further efforts to centralize the Thai sangha from the capital at this time.

Wachirayan also led a reform in Buddhist education, mainly by writing new textbooks for the study of Pali (in six volumes), known as the Bali Waiyakon, which provided an easier way to learn Pali than the traditional grammar books. Wachirayan also wrote some other influential Thai Buddhist doctrinal works, including Phuttasasana Suphasit (Selected Buddhist proverbs), Phutthaprawat (Life of the Buddha), and Winayamuk (Entrance to the Vinaya). He also established Dhammacakṣu, the first Buddhist journal in Siam. Due to his extensive scholarly achievements, Prince Wachirayan has been called "the leading intellectual of his generation in Siam" by historian David K. Wyatt. Because the prestigious state examinations relied mainly on Prince Wachirayan's works, his doctrinal interpretations became the orthodox doctrine of official Thai Buddhism. The new examinations and curriculum eventually spread throughout the provinces where the prince sent learned monks to promote the new education system.

A new national system of written exams for monks was introduced in 1911, known as the Mahamakut system to raise the standards of doctrinal learning. Prince Wachirayan's Nawakowat was used as the main textbook. It remains an influential textbook in Thai Buddhist doctrinal studies today. The examinations were divided into two levels, ordinary (which focused on doctrine, not Pali) and advanced (including knowledge of Pali). The textbooks of Wachirayan provided Thai monastics with the means to understand the Buddhist doctrine in their own language.

The new national examination system was influenced by the passing of the nation's first military service act, which included an exemption for "monks and novices knowledgeable of the Dhamma." Because of this, it was vital to have a proper legal definition for this statement. After the death of Wachirayan in 1921, exams for lay persons were introduced in 1929. The Thai examination system remains widely influential in Thai Buddhism today, and are a matter of focus for many monks and novices.

Portaint of Ajahn Mun

During the early 20th century, a new Thai Buddhist tradition was beginning to take in northern Thailand (mainly Isan), outside of the elite and royal circles of Bangkok. This back-to-the-forest movement of strict monasticism became known as the Kammaṭṭhāna Forest Tradition. Led by figures such as Ajahn Mun Bhuridatto (1870–1949) and Ajahn Sao Kantasīlo (1861–1941), forest tradition monks focused on asceticism (dhutanga) and meditation, seeking to achieve awakening. They criticized the text-based approaches of city monks, and initially some tension existed between them and the official monks in the sangha hierarchy.

Another Buddhist council was held in Bangkok during the reign of Rama VII (1925–1935). This council saw a new edition of the Pali Canon published which was distributed throughout the country.

Rama VII was also the last absolute monarch of Thailand, which transformed into a constitutional monarchy in 1932. During this period, the Thai writer Kulap Saipradit (1905–1974) wrote Phajon Barb (Facing Sin), a religious novel.

=== Since 1932 ===
After the Siamese revolution of 1932, there was a creation of a constitutional state. In parallel to these developments, a group of monks began to organize in an effort to democratize the sangha administration. In February 1935, two thousand monks from twelve provinces converged on the capital to petition for sangha administration reform.

These pressures led to the Sangha Act of 1941, which introduced democratic elements into the sangha's administration. However, the act also provided for the appointment of a sangharaja (supreme patriarch of the community) by the king at the head of the Thai sangha. The sangharaja served for life. The ecclesiastical assembly was composed of 45 members, all of whom were elder monks of high rank. Another major event of the constitutional period was the translation of the entire Pali Canon into the Thai language. This was completed during the reign of Rama VIII (1935–1946). In 1946, the long reign of Rama IX, Bhumibol Adulyadej (1946–2016) began. In 1956, the 2,500th Buddha Jayanti (anniversary of the Buddha's nirvana) celebrations were held throughout the nation and were subsidized by the state.

Beginning in 1949, there was a major dispute in the Thai sangha between the Mahanikaya and Dhammayutika orders. The sectarian conflict began during an attempt by Dhammayutika monasteries in the provinces to break off from the control of Mahanikaya officials. There was also long-standing resentment on the part of Mahanikaya monks, since even though their sect constituted the overwhelming majority of monastics, the Dhammayutika monks controlled most of the high ecclesiastical offices.

The struggle for power continued for years, and led a disgruntled Sarit Thanarat (a general who seized power in a 1957 coup d'état), to pass another Sangha Act in 1962. The act removed most democratic provisions from the sangha administration and centralized power around the sangharaja. It affirmed that "absolute rule" of the sangha by one leader was best and allowed the sangharaja to appoint from half to two thirds of the elders in the supreme council. The act also allowed for the removal of the sangharaja by the secular authority, practically subordinating the sangha to the state in the most direct manner possible.

Sarit Thanarat also saw the sangha as a way to promote national development. As such, the sangha's role was expanded into more secular realms, and this was welcomed by many monks who saw this as a way for the sangha to remain relevant in the modern age. One example of this was the expansion of the curriculum of the Buddhist universities (Mahachulalongkon and Mahamakut) to include numerous departments focused on secular subjects like education, psychology, library science, mathematics and physical science.

From 1966 to 1970, monastic graduates from these universities were sent to the provinces to improve education in rural areas. They helped with local development projects as well as providing more traditional Buddhist guidance associated with scriptural study and meditation. Part of their role was also to convert rural peoples, such as the hill tribes in the north, to Buddhism. However, studies by the anthropologist Charles F. Keyes argued that these efforts mostly transmitted fragments of overt behavior, such as how to give alms to monks, without teaching proper Buddhist doctrine.

==== Growth of the forest tradition ====
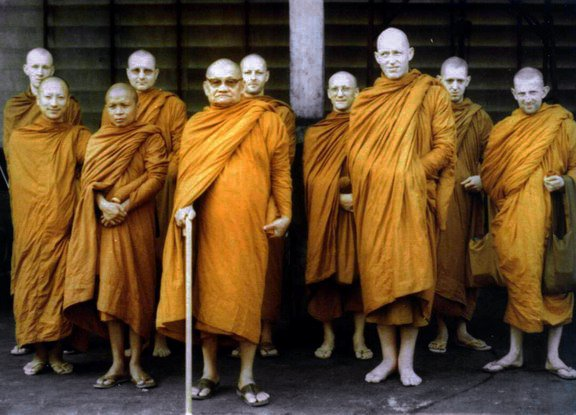
Thai Forest teacher Ajahn Chah with the senior representative of the tradition in England, Ajahn Sumedho (front right), the senior representative in North America Ajahn Pasanno (rear and left of Sumedho) and other monastics

During the 20th century, the Thai forest tradition continued to grow, with charismatic figures such as Ajahn Maha Bua, Ajahn Chah, Ajahn Thate and Ajahn Lee (all students of the now famous Ajahn Mun) developing influential monastic communities.

Ajahn Chah's tradition was particularly influential in the dissemination of Thai Buddhist monasticism to the western world. Wat Pah Nanachat, a monastery built specifically for international monastics attracted various figures who would later go on to spread the Thai forest tradition to the west, founding their own monasteries in the UK, Canada, Australia, New Zealand, Germany, Italy and the United States.

The forest tradition was heavily affected by the extensive deforestation that took place in Thailand in the closing of the 20th century. In the 1990s, Members of the Forestry Bureau deeded tracts of land to forest monasteries in an effort to preserve wilderness. These monasteries along with the land surrounding them, have turned into sort of "forested islands".

=== New Buddhist movements ===
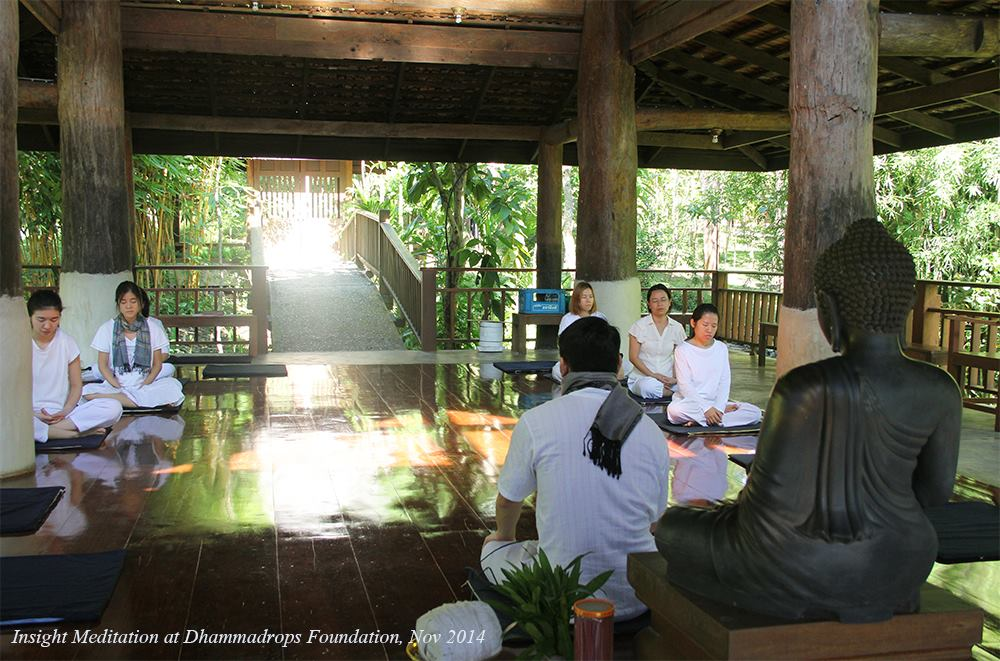
Laypersons practicing meditation at Dhammadrops Foundation, Chiang Mai

Since the 1950s, there has been an increased interest in the practice of Buddhist meditation throughout Thailand, especially among lay persons. Meditation is now practiced in monasteries throughout Thailand by Thai lay people, and this is one of the biggest changes in Theravada Buddhist practice since the second world war. This influential meditation movement (which grew rapidly in the 1960s and 1970s) was sparked by the introduction of the Burmese Vipassana tradition of Mahasi Sayadaw, by figures such as Phra Phimolatham, who was the ecclesiastical minister of the interior and the abbot of Wat Mahathat (the center of the Mahanikai order).

The rival Thammayut order, led by Somdet Phra Mahawirawong, also promoted meditation in their monasteries. This led to the widespread celebration of the teachings of the forest tradition as well which had previously been an insignificant part of the Buddhist order in Thailand. As such, a broad slew of meditation methods and teachings developed during the second half of the 20th century.

From the 1970s onwards, there has been several new Buddhist movements in Thailand who are outside of the traditional Thai monastic orders. Some of the most influential ones are Wat Phra Dhammakaya and Shanti Asoke. Wat Phra Dhammakaya is a new Buddhist sect which developed out of the Dhammakaya tradition. It's a practice of meditation that may have been influenced by the esoteric Yogavacara tradition. The most important aspect of this meditation is the focus on the center of the body, which leads to the attainment of the Dhammakāya, the Dhamma-body, found within every human being. Shanti Asoke (meaning "Peaceful Asoka") is a movement which focuses on simplicity and self-sufficiency.

There is also a Buddhist environmental movement, which arose as a response to deforestation. One of their main forms of protecting their environment has been to "ordain" trees by wrapping a monk's robe around the tree.

The 21st century saw the rise of a few ultra-nationalist anti-Muslim Buddhist monks. This is mainly a phenomenon in southern Thailand, where there is much tension among Buddhists and Malay Muslims. Some even carry weapons and are known as "soldier monks" (thahan phra). Some of these extremist nationalist monks, like Phra Apichart Punnajanto (who called for the burning down of mosques—a pārājika offence), have been forced to leave the monastic order.

Beginning in 2023, there has been renewed movement to bring Buddhism to ethnic minorities and hill tribes by the World Fellowship of Buddhists Headquarter in Thailand. Such efforts has give rise to 300 hill tribes families and 300 Karen families in Galyani Vadhana district and Omkoi district in Chiang Mai province becoming Buddhists.

== Practices ==
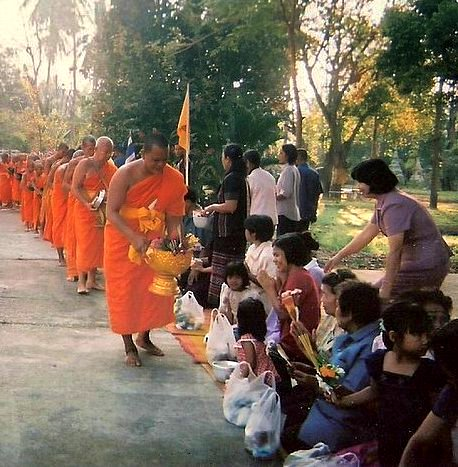
Buddhist monks on piṇḍapāta (alms round) receiving food from villagers

Common Thai Buddhist practices revolve around the monastic sangha. A major practice among lay persons is donating to the sangha, a practice that generates merit (tham bun), which is a beneficial and protective force that leads to good results in this life and in lives to come.

Meditation practice, which only became widespread in the 20th century, is also an important part of contemporary Thai Buddhism, and it is practiced by both monastics and by lay persons.

There are numerous traditional rites of passage in Thai Buddhism, such as the childbirth ritual, inviting Buddhist monks to bless the union before a marriage, and rites for the dead (which include chanting throughout the night). Entering the monkhood for a short period of time is also a common practice for Thai boys as it prepares them for adulthood and generates merit.

There are also various holidays that lay persons take part in (usually at a Buddhist temple), these include specifically Buddhist holidays like Makhabucha (February), Wisakhabucha (May), and Kathina Festivals (mid-October to mid-November) as well as holidays like the Thai new year. Thai lay persons may also go to a temple or practice Buddhism during the four monthly holy days (wan phra, Pali: Uposatha).

== Influences ==
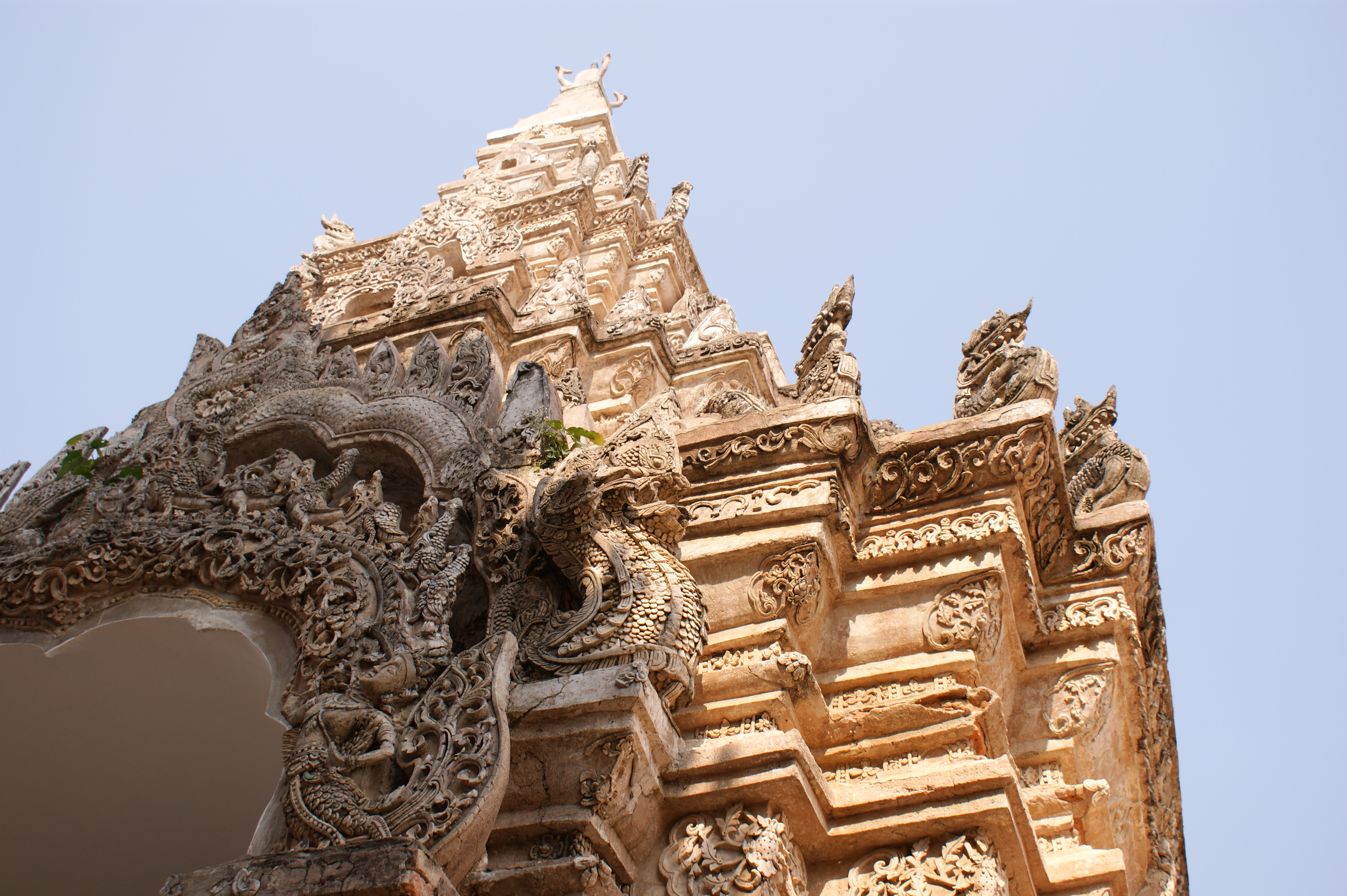
Detail of the entrance gate of Wat Phra That Lampang Luang

Various major forces have influenced the development of Buddhism in Thailand. By far the most dominant and influential tradition is the Theravada school, which arrived from Sri Lanka during the medieval era. Because of this, Thai Buddhism has close ties with the Buddhism of other Southeast Asian countries, like Burma. They not only share the same religious language (Pāli) and same scriptural canon (the Pāli Canon), but they also share many practices.

The second major influence on Thai Buddhism is Hindu beliefs which came from Cambodia, particularly during the time of the Sukhothai Kingdom. Hinduism played a strong role in the early Thai institution of kingship, just as it did in Cambodia, and exerted influence in the creation of laws and order for Thai society as well as for Thai religion. Certain rituals practiced in modern Thailand, either by monks or by Hindu ritual specialists, are either explicitly identified as Hindu in origin, or are easily seen to be derived from Hindu practices. While the visibility of Hinduism in Thai society has been diminished substantially during the Chakri Dynasty, Hindu influences, particularly shrines to the god Brahma, continue to be seen in and around Buddhist institutions and ceremonies.

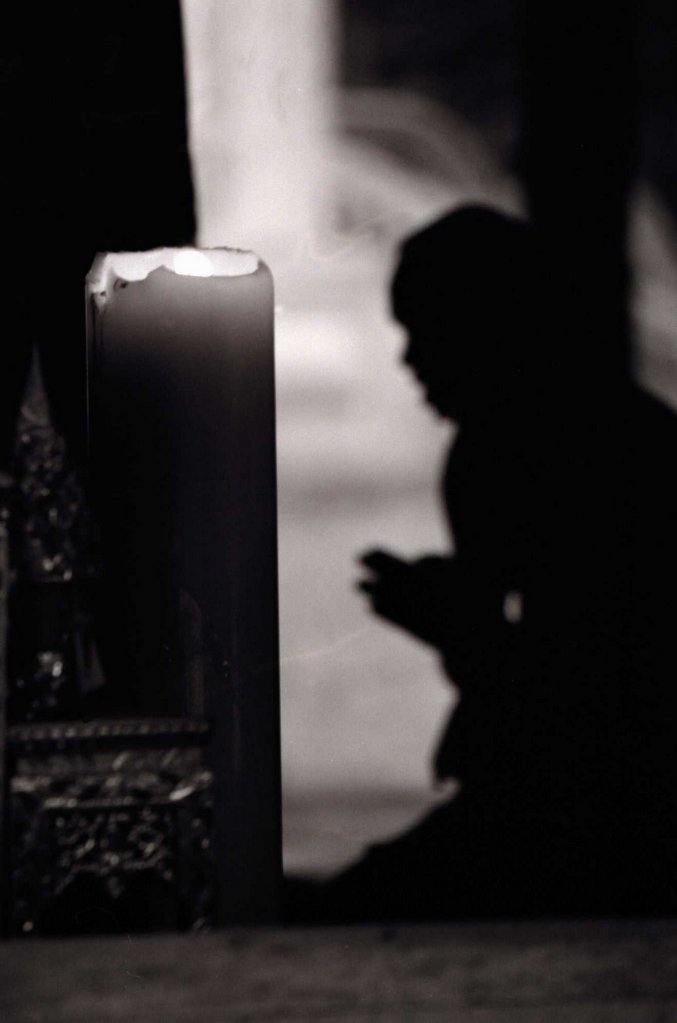
A bhikkhu chants evening prayers inside a monastery located near the town of Kantharalak, Thailand.

Folk religion—attempts to propitiate and attract the favor of local spirits known as phi—forms the third major influence on Thai Buddhism. While Western observers (as well as Western-educated Thais) have often drawn a clear line between Thai Buddhism and folk religious practices, this distinction is rarely observed in more rural locales. Spiritual power derived from the observance of Buddhist precepts and rituals is employed in attempting to appease local nature spirits.

Many restrictions observed by rural Buddhist monks are derived not from the orthodox Vinaya, but from actions derived from the practice of folk magic. Astrology, numerology, and the creation of talismans and charms also play a prominent role in Buddhism as practiced by the average Thai, practices that are censured by the Buddha in Buddhist texts (see Digha Nikaya 2, ff).

Additionally, more minor influences can be observed stemming from contact with Mahayana Buddhism. Early Buddhism in Thailand is thought to have been derived from an unknown Mahayana tradition. While Mahayana Buddhism was gradually eclipsed in Thailand, certain features of Thai Buddhism—such as the appearance of the bodhisattva Lokeśvara in some Thai religious architecture, and the belief that the king of Thailand is a bodhisattva himself—reveal the influence of Mahayana concepts.

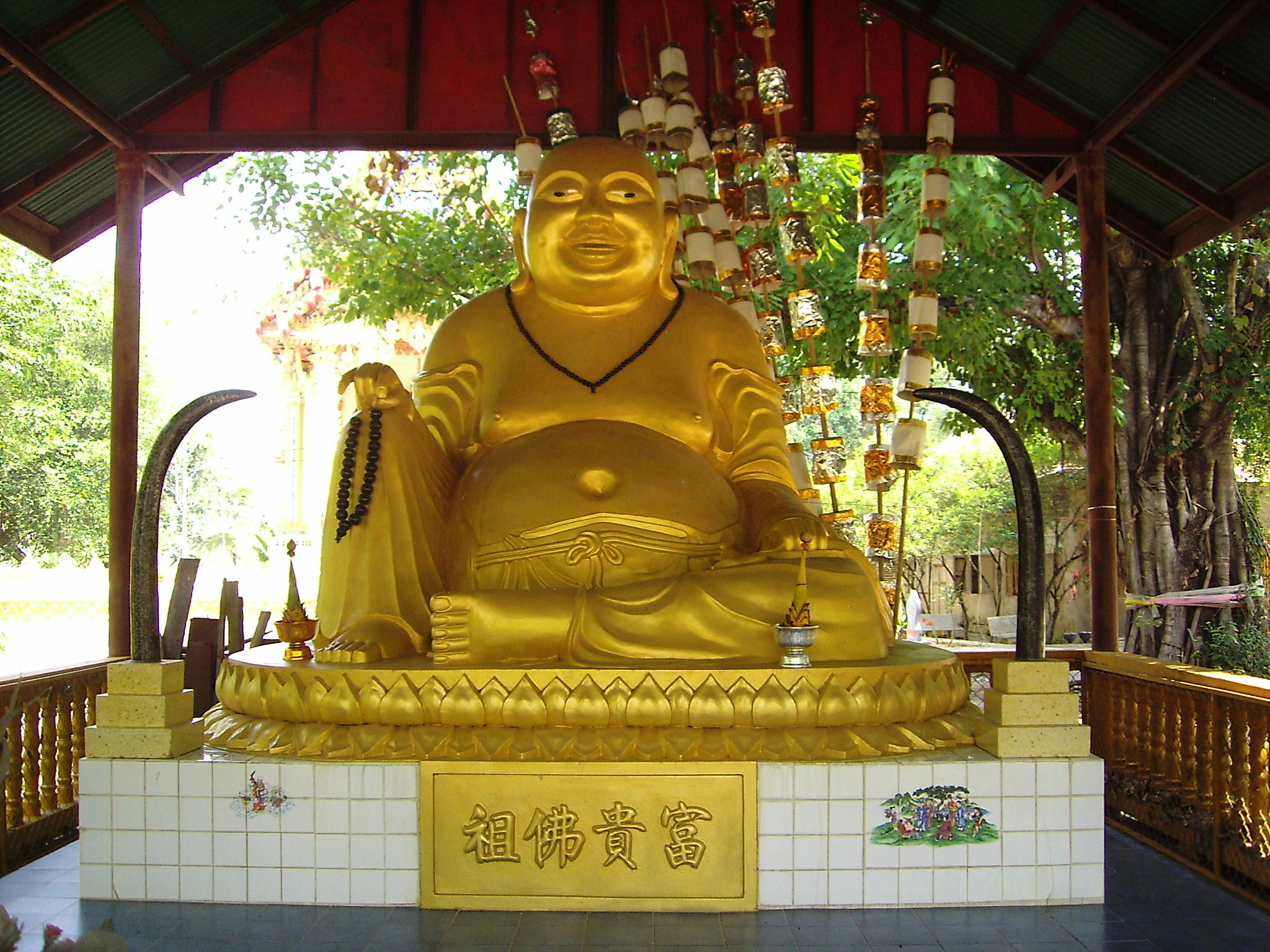
Budai, Wat Don Phra Chao, Yasothon, Thailand

The only other bodhisattva prominent in Thai religion is Maitreya, often depicted in Budai form, and often confused with Phra Sangkajai (Thai: พระสังกัจจายน์), a similar but different figure in Thai Buddhist folklore. Images of one or both can be found in many Thai Buddhist temples, and on amulets as well. Thai may pray to be reborn during the time of Maitreya, or dedicate merit from worship activities to that end.

In modern times, additional Mahayana influence has stemmed from the presence of Overseas Chinese in Thai society. While some Chinese have "converted" to Thai-style Theravada Buddhism, many others maintain their own separate temples in the East Asian Mahayana tradition. The growing popularity of Guanyin, a form of Avalokiteśvara, may be attributed to the Chinese presence in Thailand.

The Indian Influence: A Look at the Different Periods

=== Dvaravati Period (6th–11th centuries CE) ===
Dvaravati was an ancient Mon Kingdom, regarded as the first historic culture of present-day Thailand. Literary and archaeological evidence confirms that between the 6th to 11th centuries CE, Central Thailand was the homeland to this Buddhist Kingdom Chinese historians and pilgrims referred to it as a Buddhist kingdom To-lo-po-ti, which they also believed to be a translation of the Sanskrit word Dvarati, meaning "which was gates." The Dvaravati Period has been marked as a period of cultural growth, social complexity, and incipient urbanization in Thailand.

=== Lopburi Period (11th–13th centuries CE) ===
The term "Lopburi" derives from the city of the same name, which emerged in Thailand in the 7th century CE. This term refers to a typical style of Hindu and Mahayana Buddhist sculptures and architecture found in the central, east and northeast regions of Thailand during the 11th to 13th centuries CE. There had been long cultural relations and interactions between the ancient states of Thailand and Cambodia. The style was comparable with those styles of Khmer sculptures and architecture in Cambodia, therefore the 'Ancient Khmer Style of Thailand' is used as an alternative term for Lopburi Style. Nevertheless, the artworks of ancient Cambodia and those of the regions had their own distinctive features. Proceeding further, Phimai is a religious sanctuary of Mahayana Buddhists and also one of the biggest and most important religious sanctuaries found in Thailand. It was built around the 11th-12th century CE. The rectangular complex of Phimai is completely surrounded by moats and outer walls.

=== Ayutthaya Period (14th–18th centuries CE) ===
Phra Nakhon Si Ayutthaya, also simply called Ayutthaya, is a former capital of Thailand which used to be one of the biggest cities in Southeast Asia. It is notable for its temple ruins and historical sites.

=== Sukhothai Period (13th–14th centuries CE) ===
The ancient capital Sukhothai (meaning "Dawn of Happiness") was founded in the 13th century and considered to be the first independent Thai kingdom and the prominent era in Thai history. It enjoyed a golden age under the great King Ramkhamhaeng. Overgrown for many centuries, the unique artistic, architectural, cultural and administrative styles were the highlights of the kingdom. Pagodas, stone inscriptions, Buddha images, potteries and artefacts were recovered in Sukhothai and associated historic towns reflect the height of craftsmanship and creativity.

== Government ties ==
While Thailand is a constitutional monarchy, it inherited a strong Southeast Asian tradition of Buddhist kingship that tied the legitimacy of the state to its protection and support for Buddhist institutions. This connection has been maintained into the modern era, with Buddhist institutions and clergy being granted special benefits by the government, as well as being subjected to a certain amount of governmental oversight. Part of the coronation of the Thai monarch includes the king proceeding to the chapel royal (the Wat Phra Kaew) to vow to be a "defender of the faith" in front of a chapter of monks including the Supreme Patriarch of Thailand.

In addition to the ecclesiastical leadership of the sangha, a secular government ministry supervises Buddhist temples and monks. The legal status of Buddhist sects and reform movements has been an issue of contention in some cases, particularly in the case of Santi Asoke, which was legally forbidden from calling itself a Buddhist denomination, and in the case of the ordination of women attempting to revive the Theravada bhikkhuni lineage have been prosecuted for attempting to impersonate members of the clergy.

Since 2002, the Thai Senate has reviewed and revoked the secular law from 1928 banning women's full ordination in Buddhism as unconstitutional for being counter to laws protecting freedom of religion. More than 20 Thai women have since ordained in temples, monasteries and meditations centers led by Thai bhikkhunis emerging in Samut Sakhon, Chiang Mai and Rayong. The stance of the Thai sangha hierarchy has largely changed from one of denial of the existence of bhikkhunis to one of acceptance of them as of foreign (non-Thai) traditions. However Thailand's two main Theravada Buddhist orders, the Mahanikaya and Dhammayutika Nikaya, have yet to officially accept fully ordained women into their ranks. Despite substantial and growing support inside the religious hierarchy, some opposition to the ordination of women within the sangha remains.

To obtain a passport for travel abroad, a monk must have an official letter from Sangha Supreme Council granting the applicant permission to travel abroad, a Buddhist monk identification card, a copy of house or temple registration and they must submit any previous Thai passport or a certified copy.

In addition to state support and recognition — in the form of formal gifts to monasteries made by government officials and the royal family (for example, Kathin)—-a number of special rights are conferred upon Buddhist monks. They are granted free passage on public transportation, and most train stations and airports have special seating sections reserved for members of the clergy. Conversely, ordained monastics are forbidden from standing for office or voting in elections.

=== Calls for state religion ===
In 2007, calls were made by some Buddhist groups for Buddhism to be recognized in the new national constitution as the state religion. This suggestion was initially rejected by the committee charged with drafting the new constitution. This move prompted protests from supporters of the initiative, including a number of marches on the capital and a hunger strike by twelve Buddhist monks. Some critics of the plan, including scholar and social critic Sulak Sivaraksa, claimed that the movement to declare Buddhism the national religion is motivated by political gain, manipulated by supporters of ousted prime minister Thaksin Shinawatra. The Constitution Drafting Committee later voted against the special status of Buddhism, provoking religious groups. They condemned the committee and the draft constitution. On 11 August 2007, Sirikit, the Queen of Thailand, expressed her concern over the issue. She said, in her birthday speech, that Buddhism is beyond politics. Some Buddhist organizations halted their campaigns the next day.

=== Government service ===
No law directly prohibits a member of any Buddhist institution, such as a monk, a novice and a nun, from being a candidate in an examination for recruitment of government officers. Though both the Council of Ministers and the Sangha Supreme Council, (the supervising body of Thai Buddhist communities), have ordered such prohibition on grounds of appropriateness, according to the Memorandum of the Cabinet's Administrative Department No. NW98/2501 dated 27 June 1958 and the Order of the Sangha Supreme Council dated 17 March 1995.

=== Elections ===
Members of the Buddhist community and the communities of other religions are not entitled to elect or be elected as a holder of any government post. For instance, the 2007 constitution of Thailand disfranchises "a Buddhist monk, a Buddhist novice, a priest or a clergy member" (Thai: "ภิกษุ สามเณร นักบวช หรือนักพรต").

The Sangha Supreme Council also declared the same prohibition, pursuant to its Order dated 17 March 1995. At the end of the Order was a statement of grounds given by Nyanasamvara, the Supreme Patriarch. The statement said:

Members of the Buddhist community are called samaṇa, those who are pacified, and also pabbajita, those who refrains from worldly activities. They are thus needed to carefully conduct themselves in a peaceful and blameless manner, for their own sake and for the sake of their community. ... Seeking to represent the people in the House of Representatives is purely the business of the State and specifically the duty of the laity according to the laws. This is not the duty of monks and novices who must be above politics. They are therefore not entitled to elect or be elected. And, for this reason, any person who has been elected as a representative will lose his membership immediately after becoming a Buddhist monk or novice. This indicates that the monkhood and noviceship are not appropriate for politics in any respect.

When a monk or novice is involved in or supports the election of any person..., the monk or novice is deemed to have breached the usual conduct of a pabbajita (one who has given up worldly life) and brought about disgrace to himself as well as to his community and religion. Such a monk or novice would be condemned by reasonable persons who are and are not the members of this religion. A pabbajita is therefore expected to stay impartial and take pity on every person...without discrimination. Moreover, the existence of both monks and the religion relies upon public respect. As a result, monks and novices ought to behave in ways that deserve the respect of the general public, not merely a specific group of people. A monk or novice who is seen by the public as having failed to uphold this rule would then be shunned, disrespected and condemned in various manners, as could be seen from many examples.

=== Under the NCPO ===
Buddhism in Thailand came under greater state control following the 2014 coup d'état. After seizing power, the military junta, the National Council for Peace and Order (NCPO), set up the National Reform Council with a religious committee led by former Thai senator Paiboon Nititawan and former monk Mano Laohavanich. Calls for reform were spearheaded by right-wing activist monk Phra Buddha Issara, who had close ties with junta leader Prayut Chan-o-cha, and was known for leading the protests in Bangkok that led to the coup.

State influence over several aspects of Thai Buddhism increased under the NCPO, with the junta's new constitution stating that the Thai government is to directly support Theravada Buddhism specifically. In 2015, the junta's National Reform Council made several proposals to give the state greater control of Buddhism, including requiring temples to open their finances to the public, ending short-term ordinations, requiring monks to carry smart cards to identify their legal and religious backgrounds, increasing control of temples bank accounts, increasing control of monastic disciplinarians, changing the abbots of all temples every five years, putting the Ministry of Culture in charge of controlling all temple assets, controlling monastic education, and taxing monks.

In 2016, Phra Buddha Issara requested that the Department of Special Investigation (DSI) investigate the assets of Thailand's leading monks, the Sangha Supreme Council. This resulted in an alleged tax evasion scandal against Somdet Chuang, the most senior member of the council who was next in line to become supreme patriarch. Although prosecutors did not charge Somdet, the incident postponed his appointment and led to a change in the law that allowed the Thai government to bypass the Sangha Supreme Council and appoint the supreme patriarch directly. This allowed the ruling junta to effectively handpick Thailand's supreme patriarch. In 2017, Somdet Chuang's appointment was withdrawn, with a monk from the Dhammayuttika Nikaya appointed instead. The appointment was made by King Rama X, who chose the name from five given to him by NCPO leader Prayut Chan-o-cha.

In February 2017, the junta used Article 44, a controversial section in the interim constitution, to replace the head of the National Office of Buddhism with a DSI official. The DSI official was removed from office a few months later after religious groups called on the government to fire him because of his reform plans, but was reinstated after a few months.

In May 2018, the NCPO launched simultaneous raids of four different temples to arrest several monks shortly after a crackdown on protesters on the anniversary of the coup. To the surprise of many officials, one of the monks arrested was Phra Buddha Issara. The right-wing monk was arrested on charges brought against him in 2014, including alleged robbery and detaining officials, however, his most serious charge was a charge of unauthorized use of the royal seal filed in 2017. Police did not state why he was then being arrested for charges filed as far back as four years. One observer described the arrest of Buddha Issara as trying to cover up the true motives or because Buddha Issara knew too much about the rulers and was seen as a threat. Another said that the junta may regard him as a loose cannon politically and that the junta is virtue signaling—deserving continued political power—to the new Thai monarch, King Maha Vajiralongkorn. All the monks arrested in the May raids were defrocked shortly after being taken into custody, and detained before trial. (Note: Thai law states that monks cannot be jailed, therefore any monk taken into custody must be defrocked if denied release on bail, even before guilt is determined.)

Anthropologist Jim Taylor argues that the arrests were the "ruling palace regime" trying to consolidate royalist power by eliminating non-royalist high-ranking monks. Taylor pointed out that the suspects of the investigations were innocent until proven guilty, yet were all defrocked before trial and stripped of decades of monastic seniority only for being accused of the crimes. The only royalist monk arrested was Buddha Issara. In July 2018, the junta passed a law giving the Thai king the ability to select members of the Sangha Supreme Council, the governing body of Thai monks, instead of the monks themselves. The alleged scandals of the 2017–18 Thai temple fraud investigations and the resulting arrests were cited as the reason for the change.

== Ordination and clergy ==
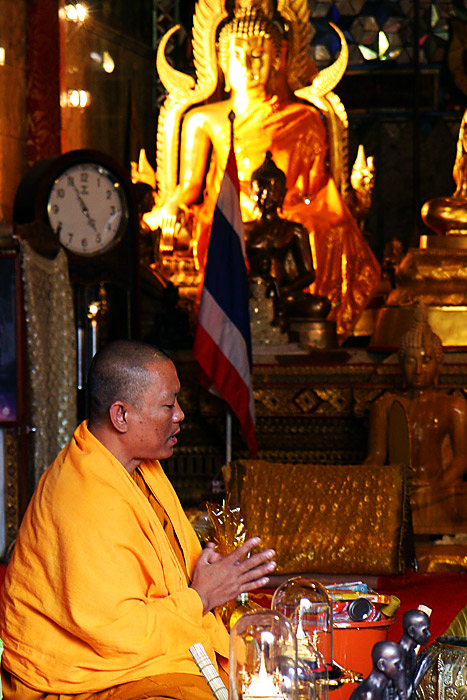
A Buddhist monk reciting prayers in Thailand

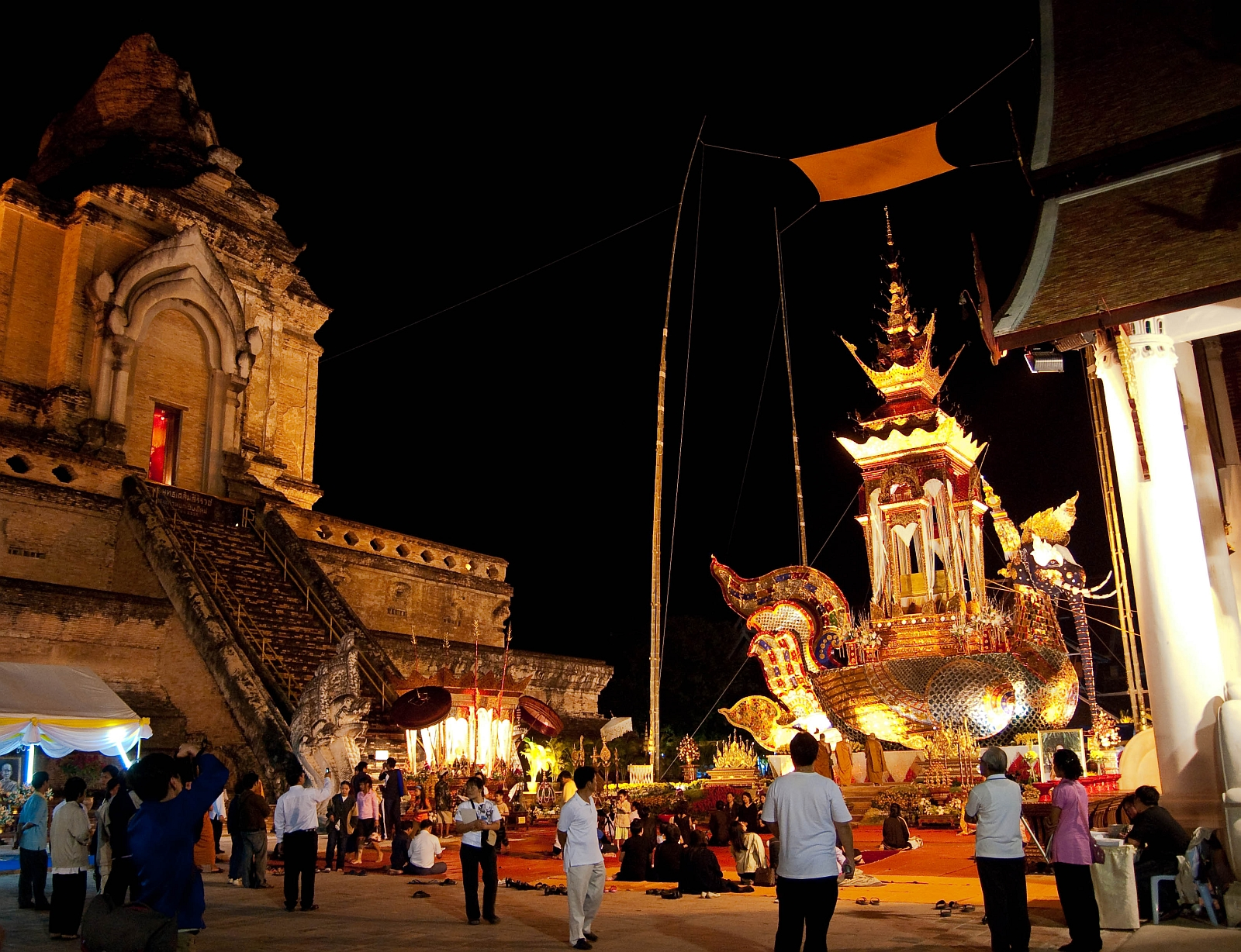
The funeral pyre at Wat Chedi Luang, Chiang Mai, for Chan Kusalo, the patriarch of northern Thailand

As in most other Theravada nations, Buddhism in Thailand is represented primarily by the presence of Buddhist monks, who serve as officiants on ceremonial occasions, as well as being responsible for preserving and conveying the teachings of the Buddha.

During the latter half of the 20th century, most monks in Thailand began their careers by serving as temple boys (Thai: เด็กวัด dek wat, "children of the wat"). Temple boys are traditionally no younger than eight and do minor housework. The primary reason for becoming a temple boy is to gain a basic education, particularly in basic reading and writing and the memorization of the scriptures chanted on ritual occasions. Prior to the creation of state-run primary schools in Thailand, village temples served as the primary form of education for most Thai boys. Service in a temple as a temple boy was a necessary prerequisite for attaining any higher education, and was the only learning available to most Thai peasants. Since the creation of a government-run educational apparatus in Thailand, the number of children living as temple boys has declined significantly. However, many government-run schools continue to operate on the premises of the local village temple.

Boys now typically ordain as sāmaṇera or novitiate monks (Thai: สามเณร samanen, often shortened to nen Thai: เณร). In some localities, girls may become sāmaṇerī. Novices live according to the Ten Precepts but are not required to follow the full range of monastic rules found in the Pātimokkha. There are a few other significant differences between novices and bhikkhus. Novices often are in closer contact with their families, spending more time in the homes of their parents than monks. Novices do not participate in the recitation of the monastic code (and the confessions of violations) that take place on the uposatha days. Novices technically do not eat with the monks in their temple, but this typically only amounts to a gap in seating, rather than the separation observed between monks and the laity. Novices usually ordain during a break from secular schooling, but those intending on a religious life, may receive secular schooling at the wat.

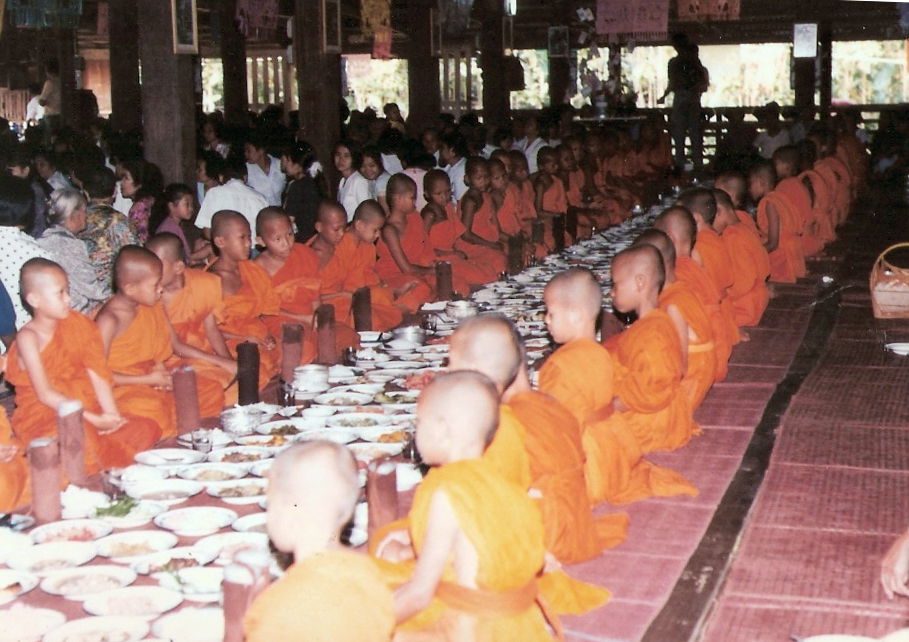
Child monks in Thailand

Young men typically do not live as novices for longer than one or two years. At the age of 20, they become eligible to receive upasampada, the higher ordination that establishes them as full bhikkhus. Novices are usually sponsored by their parents in their ordination, but in rural villages, the entire village participates by providing robes, alms bowls, and other items that monks need in their monastic lives.

Temporary ordination is the norm among Thai Buddhists. Most young men traditionally ordain for the term of a single vassa or rainy season (Thai phansa), three months or so. Those who remain monks beyond their first vassa typically remain monks for between one and three years, officiating at religious ceremonies in surrounding villages and possibly receiving further education in reading and writing (possibly including the Khom or Tai Tham alphabets traditionally used in recording religious texts). After this period of one to three years, most young monks return to secular life, going on to marry and start a family or going on to higher education or the military. Young men in Thailand who have undergone ordination are seen as being more suitable partners for marriage; unordained men are euphemistically called "unripe", while those who have been ordained are said to be "ripe". A period as a monk is a prerequisite for many positions of leadership within the village hierarchy. Most village elders or headmen were once monks, as were most traditional doctors, spirit priests, and some astrologists and fortune tellers. Thai society also sees short ordination as an appropriate transition from life phases, like being discharged from the military and going back to civilian life.

In a country where most males can be ordained as monks for even short periods of time, the experience can be profitable. Thai musician Pisitakun Kuantalaeng became a monk for a short period following the death of his father in order to make merit. He observed that, "Being a monk is good money,... When you go and pray you get 300 baht [about £7] even though you have no living expenses, and you can go four times a day. Too many monks in Thailand do it to get rich. If you become a monk for three months you have enough money for a scooter."

Monks who do not return to secular life typically specialize in either scholarship or meditation. Those who specialize in scholarship typically travel to regional education centers to begin further instruction in the Pāli language and the scriptures. In some cases, monks may learn the English language and continue on to a major monastic university in Bangkok. The scholarship route is also followed by monks who desire to rise in the ecclesiastic hierarchy, as promotions within the government-run system are contingent on passing examinations in Pāli and Dhamma studies.

Thai tradition supports lay men going into monasteries, following the monks' rules and studying while there. The time line is based on threes, staying as a monk for three days, or three weeks, or three months or three years, or three weeks and three days. This retreat is expected of all Thai males, rich or poor, and often is scheduled after high school. Such retreats bring honor to the family and blessings (merit) to the young man. Thais also make allowances for men who follow this practice, such as holding open a job.

=== Health issues ===
Rising obesity among monks and concerns for their well-being have become issues in Thailand. A study by the Health Ministry in 2017 of 200 Bangkok temples found that 60 percent of monks suffer from high cholesterol and 50 percent from high blood sugar. Public health experts attribute this to two factors. First, monks are required to accept and eat whatever is given to them on their daily alms rounds. Second, monks are not permitted to engage in cardiovascular exercise as it is undignified. Monks eat only two meals per day, breakfast and lunch. But the remainder of the day they are allowed to drink nam pana, which includes the juice of fruit less than fist-sized, often high in sugar. To combat the high rate of non-communicable diseases among monks, the National Health Commission Office (NHCO) issued a pamphlet, National Health Charter for Monks, designed to educate monks and lay people alike about healthy eating habits.

== Missionary work ==
The Thai Sangha, with cooperation with the Thai government in many occasions, have led numerous missionary works to spread Theravada Buddhism within Thailand and outside of the country. As Buddhism is viewed as "a religion with committed missionary intent", the Sangha has sponsored two forms of missionary work, namely phra thammathut sai nai prathe (home Buddhist missionaries) and phra thammathut sai tang prath (international/overseas Buddhist missionaries). Like all Buddhist organizations, the Thai Sangha believes in phra thammathu, where all monks by definition and practice are Buddhist missionary monks, as the earliest texts of Buddhism calls for the spread of Buddhism. Bhikkhus have for centuries embraced this message by making travelling or wandering to places part of their duty to spread Buddha's teaching and thus helped to establish Buddhism far and wide. Various kings, such as King Asoka, have followed this mandate, spreading Buddhism in numerous places. The Thai Sangha has a long history of ties with other sanghas from Sri Lanka, Cambodia, Laos, and Myanmar in the spread of Buddhism in other lands. The new international/overseas Buddhist missionary work was established in the mid-twentieth century, beginning through a declaration where the Thai Sangha built a temple in Bhodgaya, India in 1957, coinciding with the 2,500th year since Buddhism was founded. In 1966, the first Theravada temple in Europe was established in England under the patronage of King Bhumipol, the Thai Sangha, and the king's government. Buddhist temples in other places in Europe and North America were established afterwards. In 1969, the Sangha sent four missionary works in Indonesia to restore Theravada Buddhism in the country. In the 1970's, the United States became a focus for missionary work. Temples were built in New York, Los Angeles, Denver, Chicago, and the capital Washington DC. Contacts in Australia, India, Nepal, Indonesia, and the Philippines already occurred. In 1978, missionary works were sent to Australia. By the 1990s, around 50 Buddhism temples were established in the United States, growing to around 130 by the 2003 with 410 monks present. In 2001, missionary work was sent to Singapore, where the Council of Thai Buddhist Monks in Singapore was established. As of 2007, there are 233 Buddhist temples established by the Thai Sangha in 28 countries, other than Thailand. Despite these efforts, the number of monks who have trained to become Buddhist missionary monks have stagnated, where the annual number who finish their studies have never exceeded 81, the highest number of graduates in 2007. This number fell to 78 in 2008. Recent missionary work has largely focused on the United States according to a recent survey in 2008, while Theravada Buddhist numbers in fellow Southeast Asian countries such as the Philippines, Indonesia, and Timor-Leste have dwindled.

== Controversies ==
The Thai media often reports on Buddhist monks behaving in ways that are considered inappropriate. There have been reports of sexual assault, embezzlement, drug-taking, extravagant lifestyles, even murder. Thailand's 38,000 temples, populated by 300,000 monks, are easy targets for corruption, handling between US$3 to 3.6 billion yearly in donations, mostly untraceable cash. In a case that received much media attention, Luang Pu Nen Kham Chattiko was photographed in July 2013 wearing Ray-Ban sunglasses, holding a Louis Vuitton bag full of US dollars, and "...was later found to be a trafficker of methamphetamines, an abuser of women and the lover of a pregnant fourteen-year-old."

There have been cases of influential monks persecuted and jailed by the Thai government, through verdicts later declared moot or controversial. A well-known case in Thailand is that of Phra Phimontham, then abbot of Wat Mahadhatu, known in Thailand for having introduced the Burmese Satipatthana meditation method to Thailand. In 1962, during the Cold War, he was accused of collaboration with communist rebels and being a threat to national security, and was fully defrocked and jailed. In fact, the government persecuted him because of his political views and promotion of changes in the Sangha. Phra Phimontham had strong pro-democratic leanings, which did not comport well with the regime of the day nor the palace. Furthermore, Phra Phimontham was part of the Maha Nikaya fraternity, rather than the Dhammayuttika fraternity, which the government and monarchy historically have preferred. Phra Phimontham was likely to become the next supreme patriarch. For this reason, his treatment has been described by Thai scholars as a "struggle between patriarchs" (Thai: ศึกสมเด็จ), referring to the political objective of disabling him as a candidate. After four years, when the country changed its government, Phra Phimontham was released from prison when a military court decided he had not collaborated with communists after all. Afterwards, he ordained again and eventually regained his former status, though he continued to be discredited.

Buddhadasa Bhikkhu was subject to similar allegations from the Thai government, and so was Luang Por Phothirak, the founder of Santi Asoke. Luang Por Pothirak was eventually charged of altering the Vinaya and defrocked. A recent example is Phra Prajak Kuttajitto, an environmentalist monk critical of government policies, who was arrested and defrocked.

Thai Buddhist flag (i.e. the dhammacakka flag, ธงธรรมจักร, Thong Dhammacak)

In 1999 and again in 2002, Luang Por Dhammajayo, the then abbot of Wat Phra Dhammakaya, was accused of fraud and embezzlement by the Thai media and later some government agencies when donations of land were found in his name. Wat Phra Dhammakaya denied this, stating that it was the intention of the donors to give the land to the abbot and not the temple, and that owning personal property is common and legal in the Thai Sangha. Widespread negative media coverage at this time was symptomatic of the temple being made the scapegoat for commercial malpractice in the Thai Buddhist community in the wake of the 1997 Asian financial crisis. The Sangha Supreme Council declared that Luang Por Dhammajayo had not broken any monastic rule (Vinaya). In 2006, the Thai National Office for Buddhism cleared the Dhammakaya Foundation and Luang Por Dhammajayo of all accusations when Luang Por Dhammajayo agreed to put all of the disputed land in his temple's name.

In March 2016, Thai police formally summoned then Acting Supreme Patriarch Somdet Chuang Varapunno, after he refused to answer direct questions about his vintage car, one of only 65 made. The car was part of a museum kept at Wat Paknam Bhasicharoen in Bangkok, but has now been seized by police investigating possible tax evasion. Somdet reportedly transferred ownership of the vehicle to another monk after the scandal broke. He refused to answer police questions directly, insisting that written questions be sent to his lawyer. He did say that the car was a gift from a follower.

Analysts from different news outlets have pointed out that the actions of the Thai government towards Wat Paknam Bhasicharoen may have reflected a political need to control who should be selected as the next Supreme Patriarch, since Somdet had already been proposed as a candidate by the Sangha Supreme Council. Selecting him would mean a Supreme Patriarch from the Maha Nikaya fraternity, rather than the Dhammayuttika fraternity, which historically has always been the preferred choice of the Thai government and the monarchy. In fact, Somdet Chuang's nomination was postponed and eventually withdrawn after the Thai government changed the law in December 2016 to allow King Vajiralongkorn to appoint the Supreme Patriarch directly, with Prime Minister Prayut Chan-o-cha countersigning, leading to the appointment of a monk from the Dhammayuttika fraternity instead. The Thai government cited several reasons for this, including the car. At the end of the same year, however, prosecutors decided not to charge Somdet Chuang, but to charge his assistant abbot instead along with another six people who took part in importing the vintage car. In February 2016, in a protest organized by the National Centre for the Protection of Thai Buddhism, a Red Shirt-oriented network, the example of Phra Phimontham was also cited as demands were made for the Thai government to no longer involve itself with the selection of the next leader of the Sangha.

In November 2024, media said that "Buddhist monastery [in Phichit (province) were] 'using human bodies for meditation'"; furthermore, "Police working to ID [or identify] 41 cadavers found at Phichit site and clarify their origins".

== Reform movements ==
- The Dhammayuttika Nikaya (Thai: ธรรมยุตนิกาย) began in 1833 as a reform movement led by Prince Mongkut, son of King Rama II of Siam. It remained a reform movement until passage of the Sangha Act of 1902, which formally recognized it as the lesser of Thailand's two Theravada denominations. Mongkut was a bhikkhu under the name of Vajirañāṇo for 27 years (1824–1851) before becoming King of Siam (1851–1868). In 1836 he became the first abbot of Wat Bowonniwet Vihara. After the then 20-year-old prince entered monastic life in 1824, he noticed what he saw as serious discrepancies between the rules given in the Pāli Canon and the actual practices of Thai bhikkhus and sought to upgrade monastic discipline to make it more orthodox. Mongkut also made an effort to remove all non-Buddhist, folk religious, and superstitious elements which over the years had become part of Thai Buddhism. Dhammayuttika monks were expected to eat only one meal a day (not two) that was to be gathered during a traditional alms round.
- The Dhammakaya Movement is a Thai Buddhist tradition which was started by Luang Pu Sodh Candasaro in the early 20th century. The tradition is revivalist in nature and practices Dhammakaya meditation. The movement opposes traditional magical rituals, superstition, folk religious practices, fortune telling and giving lottery numbers, and focuses on an active style of propagating and practicing meditation. Features of the tradition include teaching meditation in a group, teaching meditation during ceremonies, teaching meditation simultaneously to monastics and lay people, teaching one main meditation method and an emphasis on lifelong ordination.
- The Santi Asoke (Thai: สันติอโศก "Peaceful Asoka") or Chao Asok ("People of Asoka") was established by Phra Bodhirak after he "declared independence from the Ecclesiastical Council (Sangha) in 1975". Santi Asoke has been described as "a transformation of the "forest monk" revival of [the 1920s and 1930s]" and "is more radical [than the Dhammakaya Movement] in its criticism of Thai society and in the details of its own vision of what constitutes a truly moral religious community."
- The Sekhiya Dhamma Sangha are a group of activist monks focusing on modern issues in Thailand (i.e., deforestation, poverty, drug addiction, and AIDS). The group was founded in 1989 among a growth of Buddhist social activism in Thailand in the latter half of the 20th century. While criticized for being too concerned and involved with worldly issues, Buddhist social activists cite duty to the community as justification for participation in engaged Buddhism

== Position of women ==
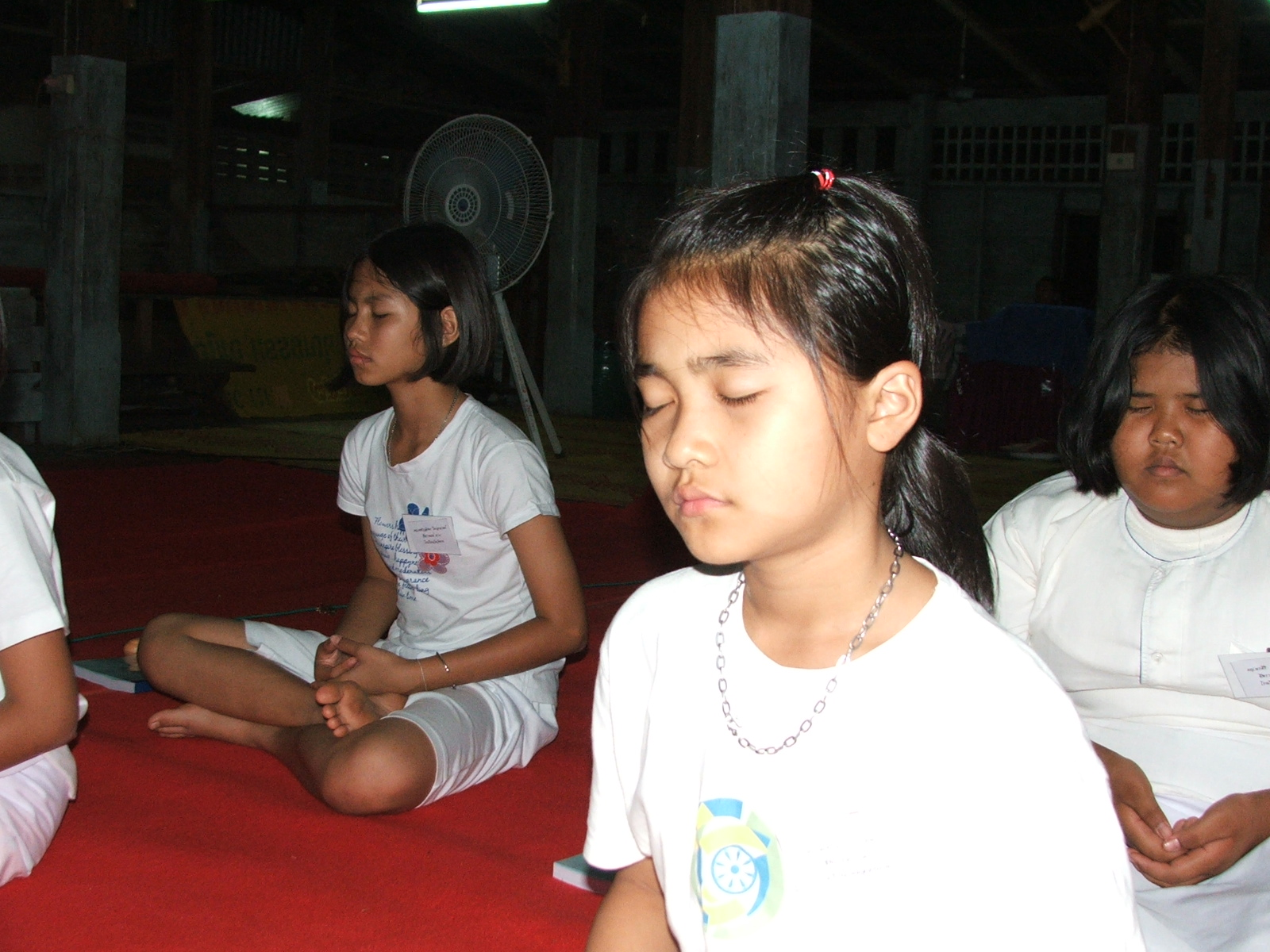
Although women in Thailand traditionally cannot ordain as bhikkhuni, they can choose to take part in quasi-monastic practices at temples and practice centers as maechi.

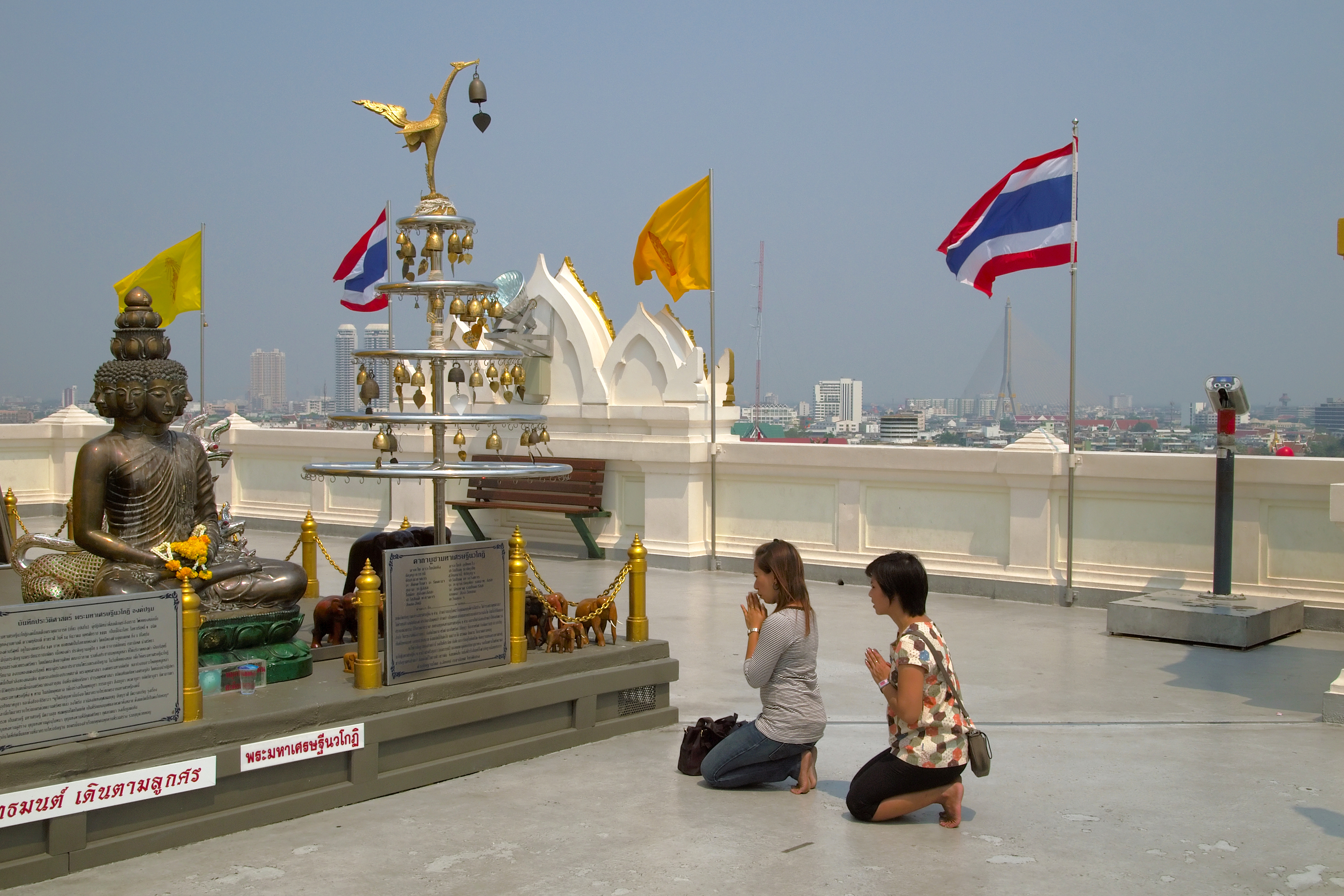
Prayer in Wat Saket

Unlike in Burma and Sri Lanka, the bhikkhuni lineage of women monastics was never established in Thailand. Women primarily participate in religious life either as lay participants in collective merit-making rituals or by doing domestic work around temples. A small number of women choose to become maechi, non-ordained religious specialists who permanently observe either the Eight or Ten Precepts. Maechi do not receive the level of support given to bhikkhu and their position in Thai society is the subject of some discussion.

There have been efforts to attempt to introduce a bhikkhuni lineage in Thailand as a step towards improving the position of women in Thai Buddhism. The main proponent of this movement has been Dhammananda Bhikkhuni. Unlike similar efforts in Sri Lanka, these efforts have been extremely controversial in Thailand. Women attempting to ordain have been accused of attempting to impersonate monks (a civil offense in Thailand), and their actions have been denounced by many members of the ecclesiastic hierarchy.

In 1928, a secular law was passed in Thailand banning women's full ordination in Buddhism. Varanggana Vanavichayen became the first female monk to be ordained in Thailand in 2002. Some time after this, the secular law was revoked. On 28 February 2003, Dhammananda Bhikkhuni received full monastic ordination as a bhikkhuni of the Theravada tradition in Sri Lanka, making her the first modern Thai woman to receive full ordination as a Theravada bhikkhuni. She is Abbess of Songdhammakalyani Monastery, the only temple in Thailand where there are bhikkhunis. It was founded by her mother, Voramai, a Mahayana bhikkhuni, in the 1960s.

No one denies that men and women have an equal chance to attain enlightenment. In Mahayana Buddhism, practised in Taiwan, mainland China, Hong Kong, and Tibet, female ordinations are common, but in countries that adhere to the Theravada tradition, such as Sri Lanka, Thailand, and Myanmar, women were banned from becoming ordained about eight centuries ago, "for fear that women entering monastic life instead of bearing children would be a disruption of social order", according to Kittipong Narit, a Buddhist scholar at Bangkok's Thammasat University. Critics charge that the ban on female ordination is about patriarchy and power. The status quo benefits those in power and they refuse to share the perks with outsiders.…in countries that adhere to the Theravada tradition, such as Sri Lanka, Thailand, and Myanmar, women were banned from becoming ordained about eight centuries ago, "for fear that women entering monastic life instead of bearing children would be a disruption of social order", according to Kittipong Narit, a Buddhist scholar at Bangkok's Thammasat University. Critics charge that the ban on female ordination is about patriarchy and power. The status quo benefits those in power and they refuse to share the perks with outsiders.

Other sources suggest the Theravāda bhikkhunī ordination lineage died out in Sri Lanka around the 11th century amid warfare and other issues, although the exact reasons for its disappearance are not clear. According to the traditional interpretation of the Pāli Vinaya (''Cullavagga'' X), full ordination (''upasampadā'') for a bhikkhunī requires dual ordination, firstly by an existing bhikkhunī sangha and then by the bhikkhu sangha. Once the bhikkhunī lineage is broken othodox Theravāda therefore claim that it cannot be restarted. Although some scholars have argued that ordination by bhikkhus alone is permissible this remains a minority view.

Most objections to the reintroduction of female monastics hinge on the fact that the monastic rules require that both five ordained monks and five ordained bhikkhunis be present for any new bhikkhuni ordination. Without such a quorum, critics say that it is not possible to ordain any new Theravada bhikkhuni. The Thai hierarchy refuses to recognize ordinations in the Dharmaguptaka tradition (the only currently existing bhikkhuni ordination lineage) as valid Theravada ordinations, citing differences in philosophical teachings and, more critically, monastic discipline.

== See also ==
- Early Buddhist Texts
- Early Buddhist schools
- Pāli Canon
- Mangala Sutta
- Metta Sutta
- Ratana Sutta
- Supreme Patriarch of Thailand
- Thai Forest Tradition
- History of the Thai Forest Tradition
- Forest Tradition of Ajahn Chah
- Dhamma Society Fund
- Mahachulalongkornrajavidyalaya University
- Mahamakut Buddhist University
- Sanam Luang Dhamma Studies
- International Buddhist Studies College
- Luang Pu Thuat
- Mahasati meditation
- Knowing Buddha
- Buddha images in Thailand
- Thai funeral
