= Watana Muangsook =

Thai politician (born 1957)

- วัฒนา เมืองสุข
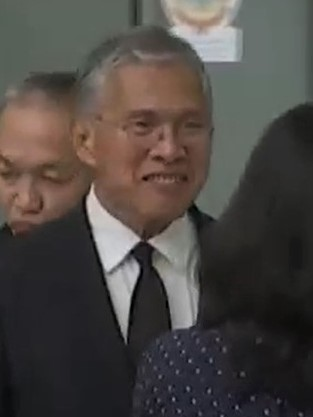

Minister of Social Development and Human Security
- In office 2 August 2005 – 19 September 2006
- Prime Minister: Thaksin Shinawatra
- Preceded by: Pracha Maleenont
- Succeeded by: Paiboon Wattanasiritham

Minister of Industry
- In office 11 March 2005 – 2 August 2005
- Prime Minister: Thaksin Shinawatra
- Preceded by: Pongsak Rattanapongpaisan
- Succeeded by: Suriya Juangroongruangkit

Minister of Commerce
- In office 8 November 2003 – 30 September 2005
- Prime Minister: Thaksin Shinawatra
- Preceded by: Adisai Bodharamik
- Succeeded by: Thanong Bidaya

Personal details
- Born: 28 May 1957 (age 69) Prachinburi, Thailand
- Party: Pheu Thai Party (2018–2020)
- Spouse: Patchara Jiaravanon
- Education: Chulalongkorn University
- Profession: Politician
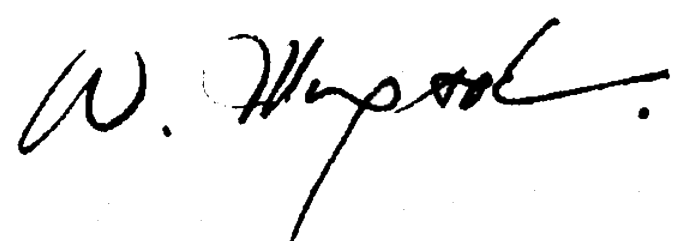
- Signature

Watana Muangsook (Thai: วัฒนา เมืองสุข; born on 28 May 1957) is a Thai politician. He has held the positions of Minister of Social Development and Human Security, Minister of Industry, Minister of Commerce and Deputy Minister of Commerce in the government of Thailand.

== Biography ==
Watana Muangsook's nickname is Kai. He was born in Prachinburi. He graduated from Suankularb Wittayalai School and Chulalongkorn University. He was also a temple boy at Wat Debsirindrawas Ratchaworawiharn.

He is married to a daughter of billionaire Sumet Jiaravanon, Patchara Jiaravanon.
