= Kappiya =

In Southeast Asian Buddhism, a boy who lives in a temple and assists the monks

Translations of Kappiya
- English: lay attendant
- Pali: kappiyakāraka
- Burmese: ကပ္ပိယ (MLCTS: kaʔpḭya̰)
- Chinese: 護僧 / 護僧合律
- Thai: ลูกศิษย์วัด / เด็กวัด (RTGS: luuk sit wat / dek wat)
- Vietnamese: hộ Tăng / hộ Tăng hợp Luật

Kappiya is a Buddhist lay manciple (attendant or steward) who resides in a monastery (vihāra) and assists Buddhist monks (bhikkhu in Pali).

== Names ==
The term kappiya, which literally means "lawful" or "proper," is of Pali origin, and is also employed in the Burmese language (Burmese: ကပ္ပိယ). The compound word kappiyakāraka (lit. 'one who makes it befitting') is also used in Pali. In Thailand, the terms luuk sit wat (ลูกศิษย์วัด) and dek wat (เด็กวัด), commonly rendered into English as "temple boy", are typically used. In Cambodia, the term khmeng voat (ក្មេងវត្ត) is used.

== Roles ==
The kappiya's primary role is to assist ordained Buddhist monks with various tasks, especially those which are forbidden by the Vinaya, the set of Buddhist monastic rules (e.g., handling of money). A kappiya is not ordained, unlike bhikkhu, bhikkhunī, sāmaṇera or sāmaṇerī. Kappiya may also assist in other capacities, including carrying alms bowls during morning alms collection, and preparing food for monks.

== Regional differences ==
=== Myanmar (Burma) ===
In Myanmar (Burma), kappiya are generally young men or boys who live in the monastery they support. Some female renunciants called kappiya thilashin also serve as lay attendants to monastic institutions (kyaung), providing support to ordained monks as managers and treasurers, entrusted with the ongoing upkeep of monasteries.

=== Thailand ===
In Thailand, kappiya are typically young boys (typically between the ages of 10 and 15) who are affiliated with temples (wat) and provide cleaning services, run errands and collect gifts in exchange for food, lodging, instruction, and other benefits. Some are sent to become temple boys to acquire merit; others, because they are given free room and board; and others to receive religious and moral instruction. Some temple boys go on to be ordained as monks themselves. Temple boys may undertake the formal step of sāmaṇera ordination as part of their role, depending on their age and local custom. Historically speaking, serving as a temple boy has provided a means for social mobility; notable figures including politicians (Chuan Leekpai and Watana Muangsook) and actors (e.g., Rangsiroj Panpeng) spent their formative years in this role.

== See also ==
- Vinaya
