= 2017–2020 Thai temple fraud investigations =

Investigations into fraud Thai government officers and temples

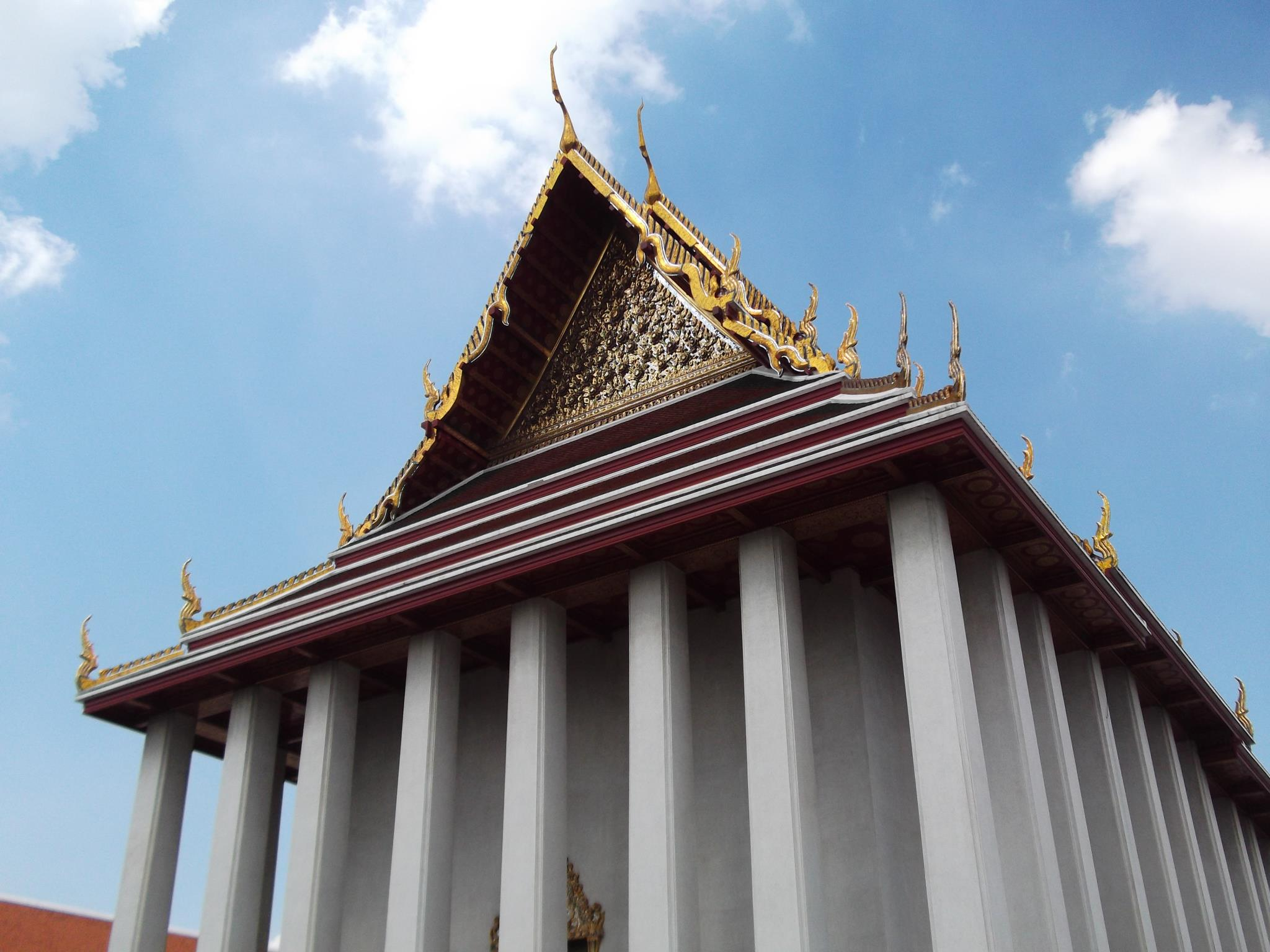
Wat Saket, Buddhist temple in Bangkok

The 2017–2020 Thai temple fraud investigations (Thai: คดีเงินทอนวัด, RTGS: khadi ngoen thon wat, lit. 'Case of returning money by temples') are a series of investigations by the Thai junta of the alleged abuse of governmental subsidies by government officers and Buddhist temples. The investigations started in 2017, and culminated in the controversial May 2018 arrest of five monks with leading positions in the Thai monastic community. The investigations have been described as unprecedented and as a critical blow to the faith of Thai Buddhist devotees. They have been subject to criticism and political speculation. In July 2018, the crisis was cited by the junta to amend laws, with the result that the monastic community could no longer choose their own leading council members, but these were to be chosen by the Thai King, and possibly the ruling NCPO.

== Background ==
In Thailand, Thai temples (Thai: วัด, RTGS: wat) do not receive regular financial support from the government, but can make budget requests from the government for restoration or maintenance of temples, educational activities, or other activities for the "dissemination of Buddhism". This is done through the National Office of Buddhism (NOB), a government department. As of 2017, this amounted to a total 2.6 billion baht for all three types of funding for temples per year.

Since 2015, the Counter Corruption Division and the State Audit Office, both governmental departments, had been receiving reports about fraud with temple budget committed by government officials. The Counter Corruption Division, which would normally report this to the police, could find little evidence. Furthermore, the NOB gave little information. This changed when, in February 2017, former policeman Pongporn Pramsaneh was appointed head of the NOB by the National Council for Peace and Order (NCPO).

== First two investigations (August 2017) ==
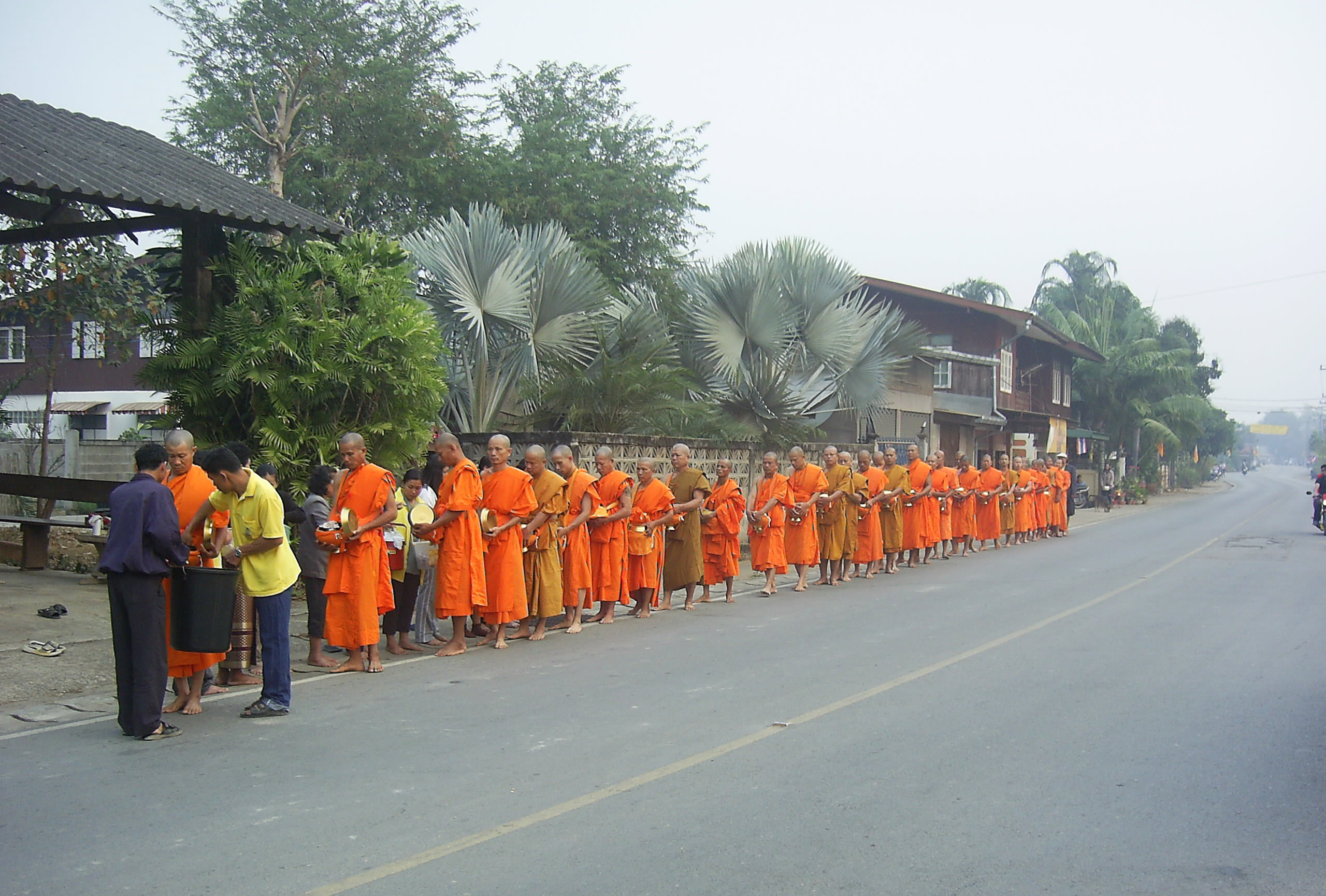
Thai monks walking to receive alms

The case started in August 2017 when Phrakhru Baitika Anand Khemanando, abbot of a temple in Phetchaburi Province, complained about NOB civil servants. He had requested a budget of eleven million baht, which was granted, but the government officer involved asked the abbot to return ten million baht to him. Khemanando made his complaint to the Counter Corruption Division and the State Audit Office. The Counter Corruption Division investigated the matter further. The commission investigated ten sites throughout Thailand and searched the houses of high-ranking officers of the NOB. The main focus was the use of budgets from 2012 to 2016 that were meant for restoration and repair of temples.

The commission stated that 33 temples had requested and received subsidies from the NOB, but ten government officials had asked twelve of these temples to return 75 percent of the obtained funds, illegally. The loss of budget was estimated at 60 million baht. Four civilians and one monk were accused of conspiring with government officials.

Later, a second investigation was held, in cooperation with another six government departments:

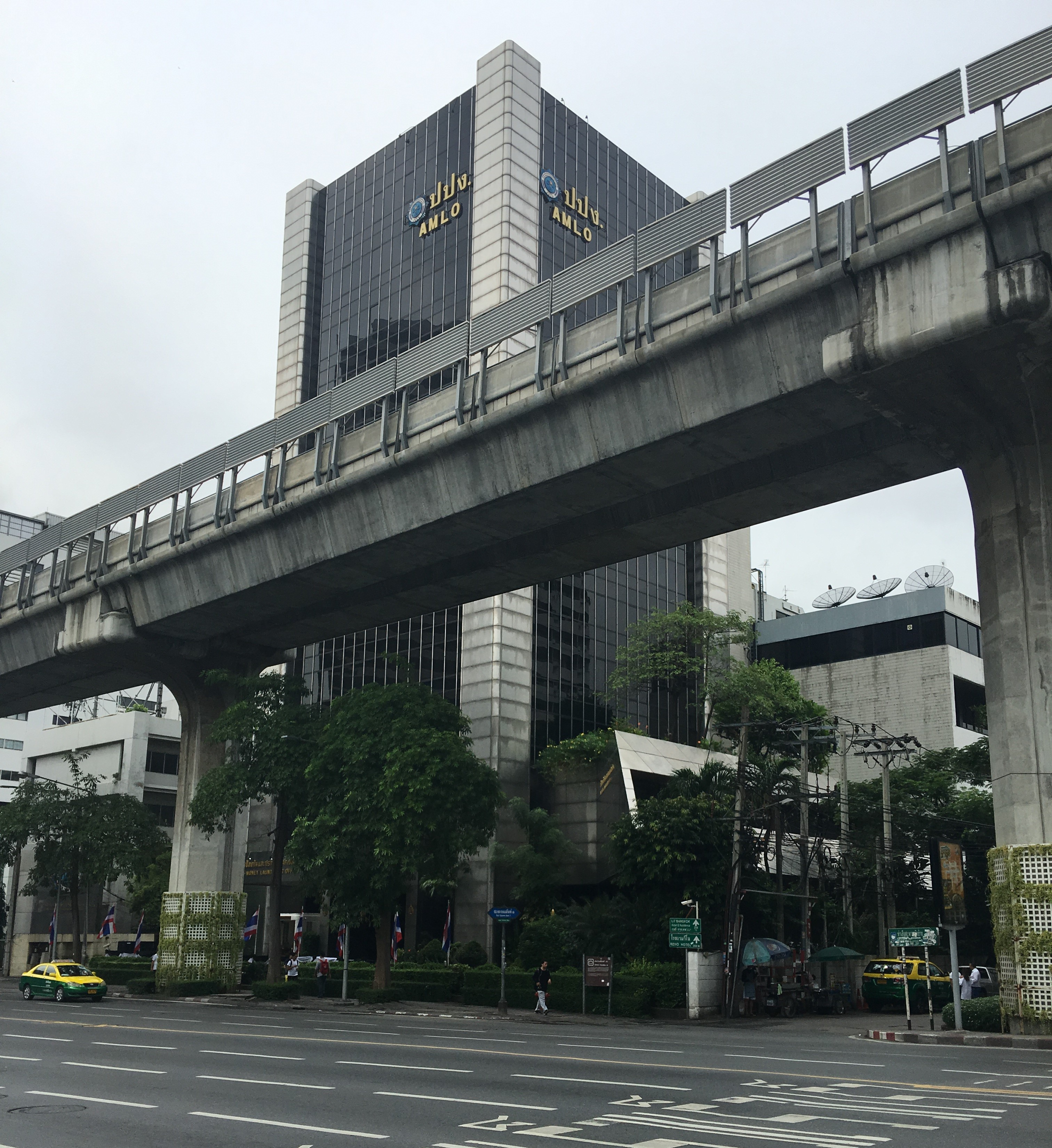
The Anti-Money Laundering Office helped to investigate fraud in the NOB.

- the Anti-Money Laundering Office;
- the Office of Public Sector Anti-Corruption Commission;
- the National Anti-Corruption Commission (NACP; another department than the Counter Corruption Division);
- the Department of Special Investigation;
- the State Audit Office; and
- the Royal Thai Police.

Inspectors discovered the same pattern in another 23 temples, with one temple losing 31 million baht in this manner. This time, the same ten officers were charged, plus another three officers, all from the NOB. The highest-ranking officers were two former NOB directors: Panom Sornsilp and Nopparat Benjawatthanan. A high-ranking soldier, who had been deployed without contract as a bodyguard at the State Audit Office, was also implicated. Temples in Ayutthaya, Songkhla, Lopburi, and Bangkok were investigated, and it was reported that the officers conspired with four monks and two other civilians. The loss was assessed at 140 to 141 million baht. As a result, four monks from Petchabun, Lopburi, and Bangkok were arrested. At least one monk was later released on bail of 1.5 million baht.

Criticism of the NOB grew quickly, as its director Pongporn came under attack. He was seen to vilify Buddhist monks. Under pressure from pro-Buddhist organizations such as the Thailand Buddhists Federation, he was temporarily removed from his position in August 2017, only to be re-appointed one month later.

On 18 July 2018, another monk in the second investigation was summoned, accused of illegally transferring government funds to another temple, not his own. This monk had a leading position in Wat Phichaiyat. As of 19 July 2018, the monk was still at large.

== Third investigation (January 2018) ==
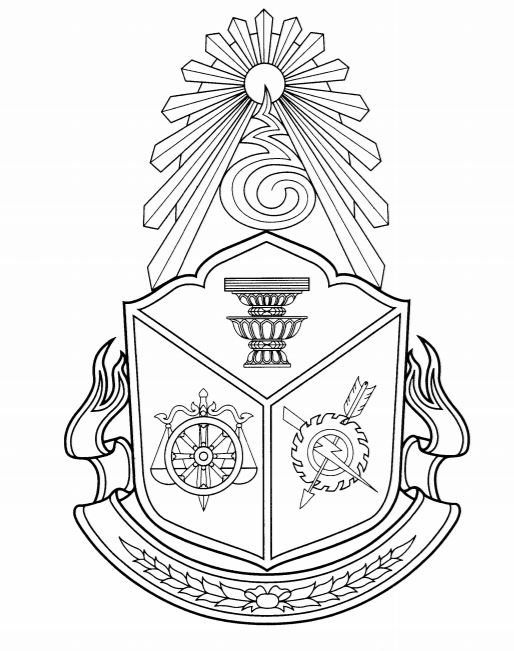
Logo of the National Anti-Corruption Commission

After his re-appointment, Pongporn started a third investigation of illegal dealings, and reported that another ten temples had had their budget cut off in the same manner as the temples in the second investigation. Pongporn revealed the names of only three temples, however. He further stated that the officers held responsible were the same suspects as before, who worked together in a network. Apart from problems with returning budget, another problem was found concerning eight monks from three temples:

- Phra Prom Dilok, a member of the Supreme Sangha Council, monastic head of the Bangkok Region and abbot of Wat Sam Phraya;
- Phra Prom Methee, also a member of the Sangha Council and head of the upper central and northern ecclesiastical regions, abbot of Wat Samphantawong;
- Phra Prom Sitthi, also a member and head of some northeastern regions, abbot of Wat Saket;
- another four monks who were assistant-abbots of Wat Saket;
- another monk who was a secretary to Phra Prom Dilok.
- In some news reports, another four unnamed accused monks are listed.

These eight monks were accused of using the funds provided for purposes other than initially requested. The government funding was spent on Buddhist projects, but for projects which had already been funded. The funds were not spent on the projects for which the budget was initially requested. In these cases, no money was withheld, though civil servants had withheld money in other, legitimate budget requests from the three temples. As the investigations continued, they were split into two task forces: the NOB continued its internal investigation and the National Anti-Corruption Commission cooperated with the Counter Corruption Division to continue the investigations of parties not part of the NOB. Pongporn made a press statement saying that a commission would be established in the NOB to deal with the suspects. Misappropriated funds to this point were estimated to be 169 million baht.

=== Arrests (May 2018) ===
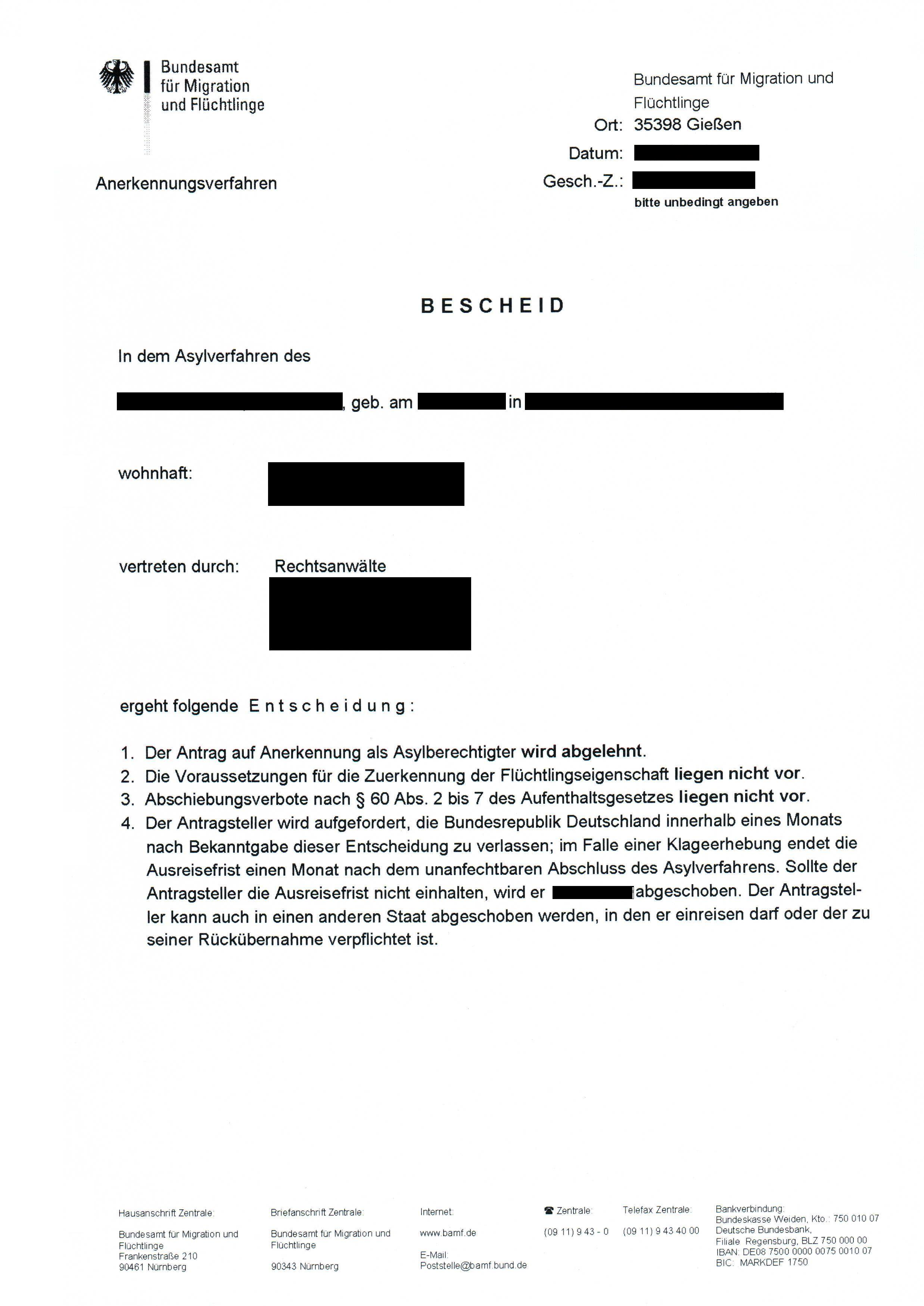
Example letter of response to an asylum request

In May 2018, authorities charged three members of the Sangha Council with government budget fraud and money laundering, citing that money was found to be transferred to accounts of supporters of their temples. The police issued arrest warrants, and the monks were to be removed from the council on 30 May 2018. Preceding that decision, on 25 May, Phra Prom Dilok, as well as the three deputy abbots, were arrested, defrocked, and held in custody. (Thai law states that monks cannot be jailed; therefore, any monk taken into custody must be defrocked if denied release on bail, even before guilt is determined.) The detention was to last for twelve days. Other monks saw their budget cut off and who were accused of being involved in the scam, but some of them argued that they were misled by officials, who stated that the budget returned to them was to be used for other temples.

The arrests of the four monks accused of money fraud were combined with the arrest of Phra Buddha Issara, a hardline, ultra-royalist monk who had taken part in the 2014 Thailand coup d'état. He was from a fourth temple called Wat Oh Noy. Many officials were surprised by this arrest, because Phra Buddha Issara was known to have close ties with the junta and had encouraged Pongporn's investigations into fraud in the first place. The monk was arrested on charges brought against him in 2014, including alleged robbery and detaining officials. The most serious charge against him, filed in 2017, was unauthorized use of the royal seal. Politician and activist Paiboon Nititawan expressed surprise that this arrest happened at the same time as the arrest of the four monks, but argued that it was unrelated to it. News commentator Chaturong Jong-asa argued that Thai authorities arrested the monks accused of fraud together with Phra Buddha Issara in order to please multiple political interest groups at the same time, without any group feeling left out.

Seal of the Constitutional Court of Thailand. The Buddhist Protection Center appealed to the court with regard to the 2018 arrests.

The arrests were made simultaneously by raids of 100–200 commandos, which was widely criticized as excessive force. Despite these unannounced raids, Phra Prom Sitthi and Phra Prom Methee were not found. The secretary of Phra Prom Dilok's temple was also taken into custody, totaling five monks. There were also four laypeople imprisoned and accused of cooperating in the alleged fraud, who were volunteers or supporters of Phra Prom Sitthi's temple, mostly connected with a media production company. One of these was the mother of the soldier accused earlier.

On 30 May, Phra Prom Sitthi turned himself in. On 4 June, the Thai authorities reported that Phra Prom Methee had fled the country and was seeking asylum in Germany. Representatives of the Thai police went to Germany to demand Phra Prom Methee's return, but to no avail: German officials stated the asylum investigations had to be finished first, and only then could extradition be considered. News outlet Matichon argued that the actions of the Thai police had possibly increased Phra Prom Methee's prospects for asylum, because it made the lawsuit look politically motivated.

During their detention, the five former monks maintained certain monastic precepts, such as eating only two meals a day. On 31 May, the three monks who were members of the Saṅgha Council were officially removed from their positions. On 17 June, the Buddhist Protection Center, a network that had previously held nationwide protests by monks against the junta, appealed to the Thai Constitutional Court, arguing that the forced defrocking of the monks without trial was unlawful and in violation of the Thai constitution.

== Fourth investigation (May 2018–present) ==
In the same period that the arrests of the four prominent monks took place, the Counter Corruption Division and the National Office of Buddhism started a fourth investigation. This one involved the use of government funds by temples in the period 2011–2016 in 60 places, spread over 13 provinces in every part of Thailand. The Counter Corruption Division and the NOB stated they found evidence of another 26 temples involved in illegal dealings, resulting in the loss of 102 to 106 million baht. Most budgets were meant to be used for repair and restoration. Investigators said that the same network of civil servants, monks, and assistant laypersons was involved in the alleged scams. As of 27 May 2018, four of the suspects had been fired, and on 4 June, the high-ranking soldier implicated earlier had been imprisoned, though not fired. Bank records showed that the soldier and his mother had received millions of baht from Thai temples. The soldier had been ordained as a temporary novice in Wat Saket before this. Furthermore, the Thai police made a statement that Phra Phrom Sitthi had admitted during his imprisonment that the money transferred to the media production company was to avoid taxes, but was used by the temple and not laundered. The Thai police argued that the money was more likely used for personal purposes.

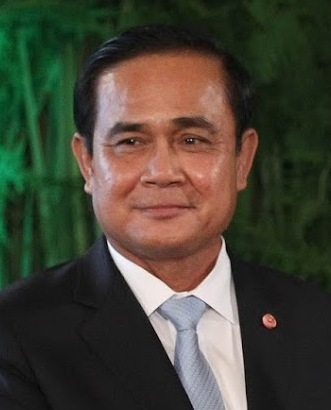
Military junta leader Prayut Chan-o-cha criticized the online response to the 2018 arrests.

Pongporn expected to complete his investigations by September 2018. Varaiyuth Suwatankhun, director of the Counter Corruption Division, stated that the main focus of the investigations was on civil servants, not monks. Meanwhile, a number of news reporters doing field research in Thai temples found that some Thai temples were unaware of any financial dealings, because they were not informed about the amount of money involved in transfers, or presumed that the NOB, as an advisory organization, knew what was best.

In May 2018, the NOB announced they would seek out examples of temples that had good financial procedures. Provincial departments of the NOB were assigned to gather information. One objective of the provincial investigations was to check whether it would be possible to operate temples without monks handling the money. However, a network called the Federation of Lawyers Protecting Buddhism petitioned the NOB to stop the investigation, because the federation considered such an investigation illegitimate. Specifically, the federation argued that the NOB acted beyond its jurisdiction. A representative of the NOB responded that they were just trying to gather information, to which the federation responded by suing the NOB for negligence in official duties. Meanwhile, junta leader Prayut Chan-o-cha responded to an increase in monks criticizing the investigations on social networks, questioning whether this was appropriate for monks. He added that "security measures" might be required.

On 20 June, Pongporn held a press conference defending the provincial investigations, stating that he was acting in accordance with the law but did not have the "authority to manage the temples". He further added that in the first two investigations, the main fault was the NOB itself, but in the third the fault was with the monks arrested, due to evidence indicating "money laundering". He concluded by insisting that any temple aware of any government officials involved in temple scams should report this to the NOB, and they would investigate. The federation and several other networks, however, recommended that any temples that had received any budget from the NOB should report this to the local police immediately, and report to the police that they would completely cooperate with any legal action against the NOB and be a witness in such cases.

== Responses and analysis ==
The arrests have been widely regarded by journalists and news analysts as unprecedented and a critical blow to the faith of Thai Buddhist devotees.

=== Foreign ===
French political journalist Arnaud Dubus and law scholar Khemthong Tonsakulrungruang wrote that the fraud investigations were symptomatic of the problem of mismanagement and corruption within the Saṅgha. Though the problems should be dealt with, the NCPO was unlikely to be able to do this because they themselves had problems of corruption and lacked political legitimacy. The Guardian stated that the timing of the investigations and subsequent raids was a clear indication that they were politically motivated, as the junta tried to assert greater control over the Thai Sangha before the next election. Paul Chambers, a lecturer at Naresuan University, claimed the arrests were done to take control of any monks who were not loyal to the National Council for Peace and Order.

Anthropologist Jim Taylor wrote that the arrests were likely politically motivated, arguing that the investigations and subsequent arrests represented the "ruling palace regime" trying to consolidate traditional, central royalist power by eliminating several non-royalist high-ranking monks and members of the Sangha Supreme Council. Taylor argued that this was done in order to take control of several wealthy temples and ensure that the next leader of the Thai Saṅgha is a royalist, pro-junta monk, pointing to the junta's previous interference with the position in 2017. Taylor also pointed out that the suspects of the investigations were innocent until proven guilty, yet were defrocked before trial and stripped of decades of monastic seniority solely based on unproven accusations.

=== Domestic ===
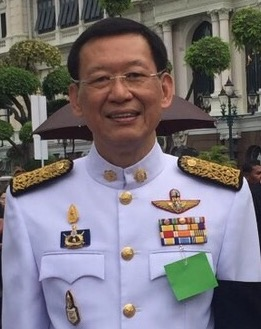
Paiboon Nititawan agreed with the 2018 arrests.

Representatives of the Thai monastic community responded to the arrests dumbfounded and saddened. Chao Khun Kasem, head of southern ecclesiastical regions and head of a pro-Buddhist network, accused the Thai junta of a lack of transparency. Chao Khun Kasem, as well as Jaroon Wannakasinanont, leader of several pro-Buddhist networks, stated that the government should deal with its own officials first, and only after that deal with the monks involved, if the monks were guilty at all. He argued that if the allocated budget was not used exactly as requested, but was still used for public rather than personal purposes, it was not a serious fault. Pisit Lilawachiropas, former member of the State Audit Office of Thailand, and Korn Meedee, chairman of the Thailand Buddhists Federation, said accusations against temples were not clear. They mentioned that the categories in the budget request procedure were very broad, and therefore different interpretations in applying the budget were likely. Chao Khun Kasem stated that officials often grant large sums to decrease paperwork, and sometimes use the same budget for several temples. Pricha Puemprasith, a scholar at Thammasart University, stated that Pongporn's very position as director of the NOB was questionable, because he was appointed by the junta rather than by Buddhist representatives.

The investigations and subsequent arrests have been described as politically motivated. Specifically, Korn has speculated that the arrest of the three Sangha Council members was a form of political revenge. According to Korn, the three council members had been instrumental in removing Pongporn from his position in August 2017. Moreover, they were understood to have connections with the United Front for Democracy Against Dictatorship that opposed the junta, and were therefore seen as a threat. Critics of the junta have argued that the high-profile arrests were an attempt to cover up the military government's own failings.

On 25 July 2017, several influential monks, among them Chao Khun Pipit, asked for a traditional, monastic boycott of the NOB, calling upon tens of thousands of Thai administrative monks to suspend communications with them. This eventually led to the temporary suspension of Pongporn's position as director in August 2017. On 1 June 2018, Jaroon, in the name of several pro-Buddhist networks, charged Pongporn with fraud and negligence in official duties, after unsuccessfully petitioning several government departments. Pongporn defended his actions in 2017 and again in June 2018, stating that most of the suspects were government officials, but if monks were involved, he had to follow procedures. Similarly, Varaiyuth and his colleague Kamol Rianracha stated in their defense that the main targets of the investigations were government officials rather than Thai temples, which, in the words of Varaiyuth, tended to be "the prey of government officers".

Some people supported the investigations and arrests, arguing that it helped improve the monastic community. Paiboon stated that the arrests were good riddance. He said that budgets were often abused by temples and since leading monks were considered civil servants under the law, they should take responsibility. Wissanu Krea-ngam, Deputy Prime Minister of Thailand, made a statement that he did not expect Thai Buddhism to be affected much by the events. Somdet Phra Ariyavongsagatanana, the Supreme Patriarch of the Thai monastic community, said he was "concerned with the current state of Buddhism", but that he understood that the authorities needed to take action. He further requested that "all organizations properly explain to the public" what was going on.

== Subsequent political reform ==
The fraud investigations have led to some ideas for political reform. Back in 2017, Pongporn stated that the structure of the NOB had been greatly improved and that subsequent fraud was less likely. In particular, more oversight had been built into the budget request procedures. Pongporn also proposed more government control over the finances of Thai temples. On a similar note, Paiboon argued that every Thai temple should have an independent lay accountant.

Pricha argued that the fraud investigations point to a larger problem: that is, the Sangha Council was responsible for too many matters, without proper organization and independent oversight—the council was responsible for legislative, executive, and judicial powers, with no division of these functions. Journalist Pravit Rojanaphruk and Buddhist scholar Vichak Panich argued that the fraud investigations pointed to a larger problem of the Thai state and religion being intermingled.

On 5 July 2018, the Thai junta amended the Saṅgha Act. An important implication of the amendment was that members of the Sangha Council were chosen by the Thai King, instead of being chosen by members of the Saṅgha themselves. Proposed by the Thai Cabinet, the amendment was unanimously approved by the National Legislative Assembly of Thailand, a government department the junta had set up since the 2014 coup. Wissanu Krea-ngam explained that the Saṅgha Council was "too old" and "often ill", which made it difficult to appoint their own members and to deal with the "current crisis". The new members would normally be appointed in September. Korn Meedee complained that too little time was given for the Saṅgha to oppose or give their opinion on the amendment and even if they submitted their response in time, the National Legislative Assembly did not respond. After the amendment had been finalized, Korn stated that Buddhist organizations could no longer protest against the new act due to the risk of violating the strict law on lèse majesté in Thailand. He did add, however, that pro-Buddhist networks did not object to the role of the Thai king, but felt it was possible the junta would choose the members instead, citing the king's authority.
