= Wat Paknam Bhasicharoen =

Thai Buddhist temple

- วัดปากน้ำภาษีเจริญ
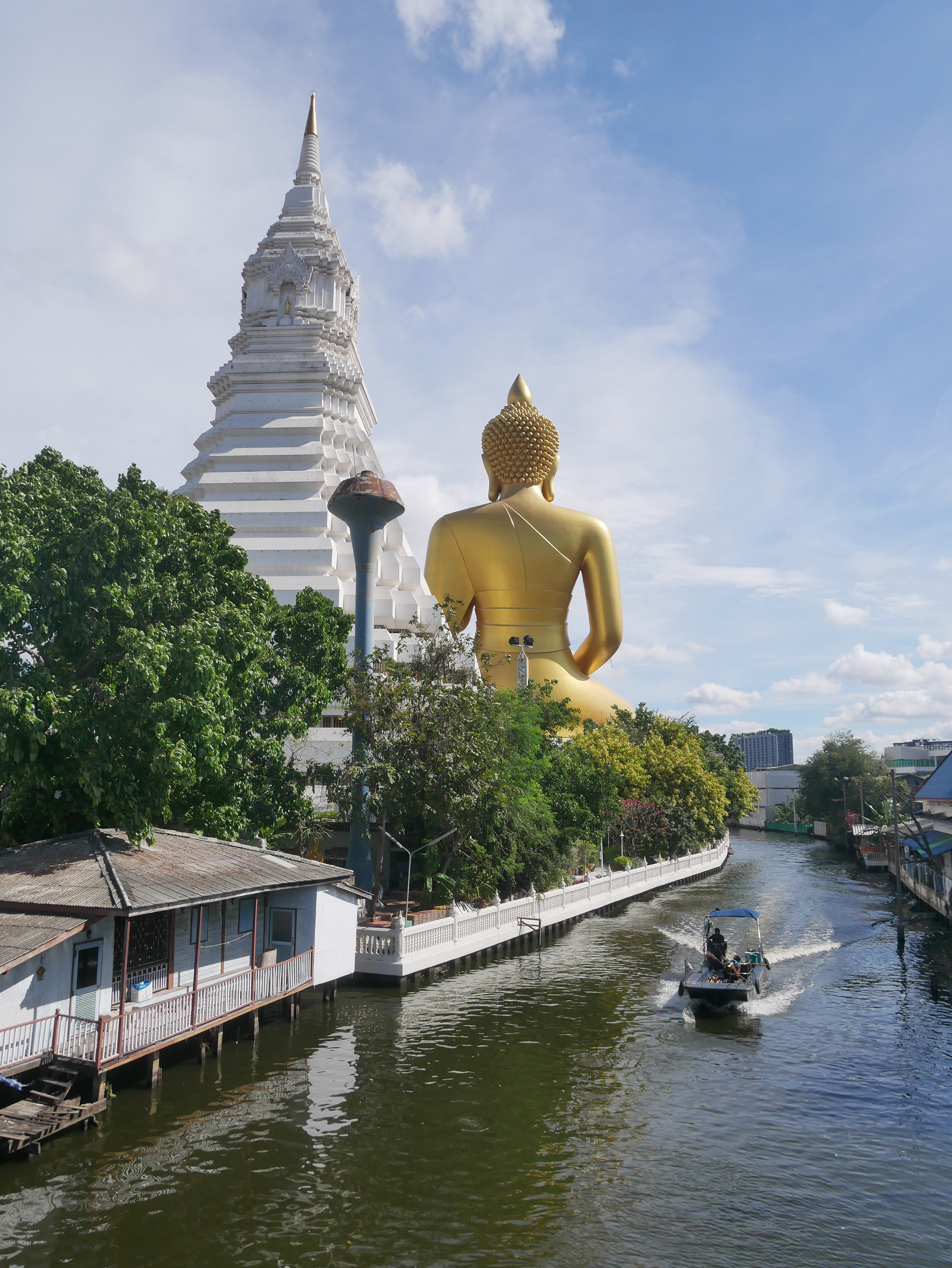

- Location within Bangkok

Religion
- Affiliation: Buddhism
- Sect: Dhammakaya, Theravāda
- District: Phasi Charoen
- Province: Bangkok
- Leadership: Phra Phrom Moli (acting)

Location
- Country: Thailand
- Interactive map of Wat Paknam Bhasicharoen
- Coordinates: 13.7217°N 100.4703°E

Wat Paknam Bhasicharoen (Thai: วัดปากน้ำภาษีเจริญ, RTGS: Wat Paknam Phasi Charoen) is a royal wat ('temple') located in Phasi Charoen district, Bangkok, at the Chao Phraya River. It is part of the Maha Nikaya fraternity and is the origin of the Dhammakaya tradition. It is a large and popular temple, supported by prosperous community members. Wat Paknam was established in 1610, during the Ayutthaya period, and received support from Thai kings until the late nineteenth century.

By the beginning of the twentieth century, the temple had become nearly abandoned and had fallen into disrepair. The temple underwent a major revival and became widely known under the leadership of the meditation master Luang Pu Sodh Candasaro, who was abbot there in the first half of the twentieth century. Seven years after Luang Pu's death, Somdet Chuang Varapuñño became the new abbot until his death in 2021.

Somdet Chuang made international headlines when his 2015 appointment as Supreme Patriarch, acting head of the Thai monastic community, was stalled and finally withdrawn, due to reasons generally interpreted as political, leading to heated debate and protests in Thailand. Somdet Chuang and his assistant were accused of tax fraud, but Somdet's charges were dropped, and his assistant was acquitted due to lack of evidence, two days after Somdet Chuang's nomination as Patriarch was withdrawn.

Wat Paknam is known for its charity and a nationwide project to propagate the five precepts in Thai society. The temple is popular among mae chi (nuns). One of its mae chi, Mae chi Chandra Khonnokyoong, went on to establish another temple which later became widely known, the Wat Phra Dhammakaya. Wat Paknam has an international presence and has a long history of activities and contact with Buddhists from other countries. In 2012, Somdet Chuang finished building a huge stupa at the temple, named "Maharatchamongkhon", complete with interior Buddhist art. In 2021, construction was completed of a large bronze Buddha image, placed in front of the stupa. The stupa and the statue has made the temple a popular attraction for international tourists.

== History ==
=== Pre-modern times (1610–1915) ===
Wat Paknam Bhasicharoen is a royal wat ('temple') located in Phasi Charoen district, Bangkok, at the Chao Phraya River. Wat Paknam was established in 1610, during the Ayutthaya period. (Note: See Chattinawat (2009, p. 53) and "อลังการ 500 ล้าน! เปิดกรุพระมหาเจดีย์ ส่องพิพิธภัณฑ์ เว่อร์วังฉบับวัดปากน้ำ" [500 million, that's impressive: the great stupa revealed, amazing palace-like museum in Wat Paknam]. Thai Rath (in Thai). 20 February 2016. Archived from the original on 12 September 2019. Only the latter contains the exact year. For an English source, see Swearer, Donald K (2004). "Thailand" (PDF). In Buswell, Robert E Jr (ed.). Encyclopedia of Buddhism. Vol. 2. Farmington Hills: Thomson-Gale. p. 831. ISBN 0-02-865720-9. Archived from the original (PDF) on 17 May 2017.) Records indicate that King Suriyenthrathibodi (1703–1709) called the temple "Wat Prasat Suan Sawan"(วัดปราสาทสวนสวรรค์; literally: 'temple of the heavenly garden palace'). However, the name "Wat Paknam" and "Wat Paknam at the river Bang Luang" (วัดปากน้ำในคลองบางหลวง) appear in historical documents of palace administration from 1780 onward. Paknam simply means 'literally: mouth of the water' or 'river/canalmouth', which refers to the position of the temple. The temple was renovated at least three times, during the periods of King Taksin, Rama III, and King Chulalongkorn (eighteenth–early twentieth century). However, during the period of King Rama VI (1881–1925), the temple had greatly deteriorated and had no abbot.

=== Revival by Luang Pu Sodh (1916–59) ===
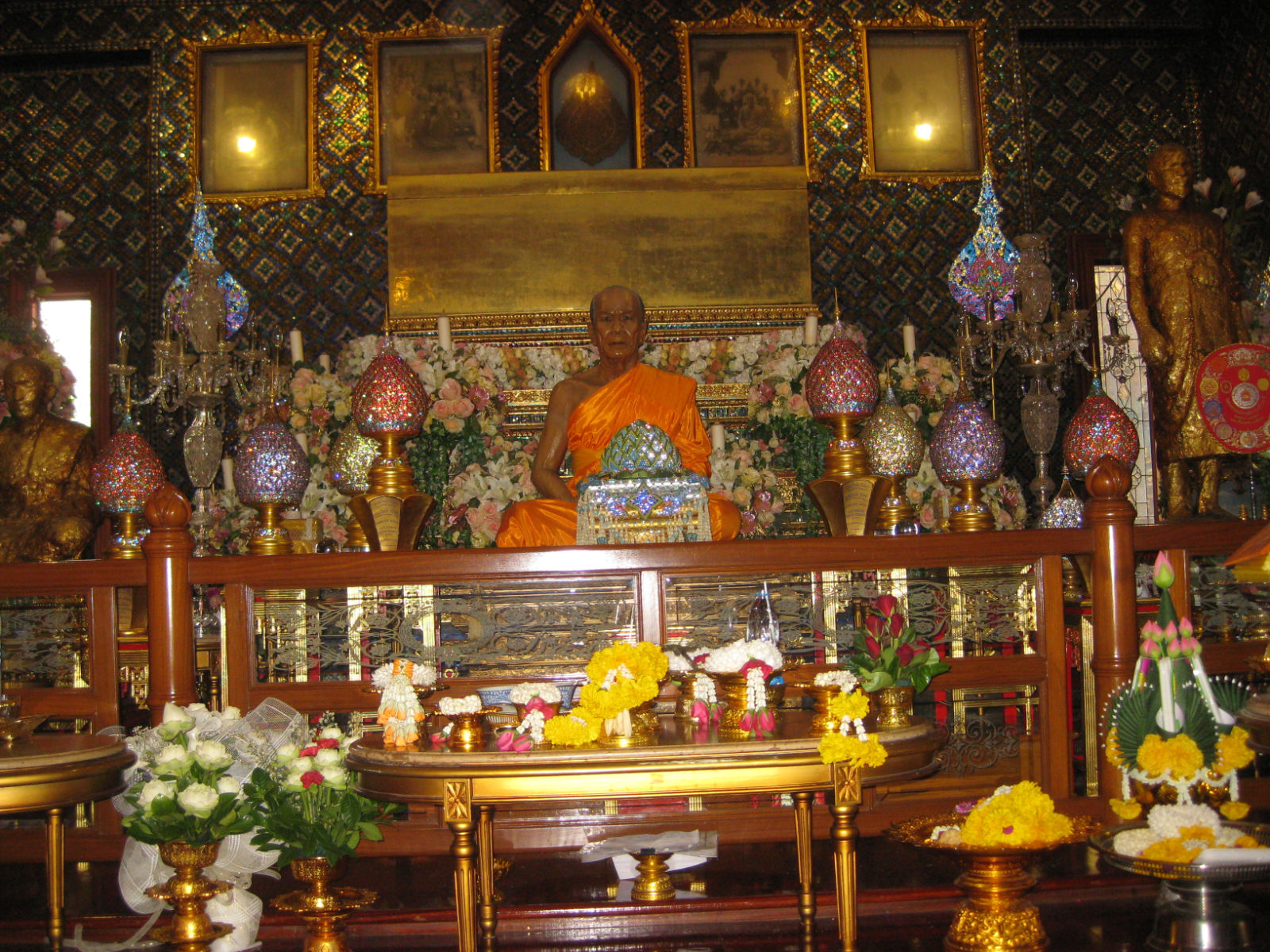
Statue of Luang Pu Sodh Candasaro at Wat Paknam Bhasicharoen, placed above his coffin

In 1916, senior monk Somdet Puean assigned Luang Pu Sodh Candasaro (1884–1959) as abbot. (Note: There are differing timelines on when this occurred. Sources generally indicate some time between 1915 and 1917.) Luang Pu Sodh was known for his charisma and outspokenness. The temple underwent a major change after he became the abbot, from a temple with only thirteen monks that was in disrepair, to a prosperous center of education and meditation practice with five hundred monks (the highest in Thailand at the time) and hundreds of mae chi. The temple became well known through Luang Pu Sodh's meditation method. Apart from teaching meditation, Luang Pu Sodh also built a school for Pali studies in 1950, which became a leading institute of the country. Luang Pu Sodh has had a lasting impact on the temple, as his teachings and guided meditations are still sold at the temple today and his promotion of Buddhist scholarship has still continued. In the time of Luang Pu Sodh, the temple became popular with and well-supported by a prosperous community of high social class, mostly from the Bangkok area. To compensate for the lack of local supporters, and at the same time dealing with the problem of local delinquent children causing trouble for the temple, Luang Pu Sodh set up a free primary school. Later, when the Thai government set up schooling all over the country, Luang Pu Sodh had the government take over the school.

Luang Pu Sodh died in 1959, and his body has been kept in a coffin. The coffin is still a major point of attraction for the temple. His remains have not been cremated, because of the large number of people still visiting the temple to pay their respects. Monastics at the temple still hold memorial ceremonies on a regular basis.

One of the most significant parts of Luang Pu Sodh's heritage is the combination of learning and meditation, both in monastic practice and teaching to laypeople.

=== Somdet Chuang Varapuñño as abbot (1960–2012) ===
When Luang Pu Sodh died in 1959, no successors were appointed, which led to discussion about who should be the next abbot. For seven years, Somdet Pun Punnasiri, who was a nephew and former attendant of Luang Pu Sodh, was caretaker abbot, waiting for a permanent candidate. (Note: Somdet Pun later became Supreme Patriarch (head of the Thai monastic community).) He was replaced by Somdet Chuang Varapuñño (born 1925).

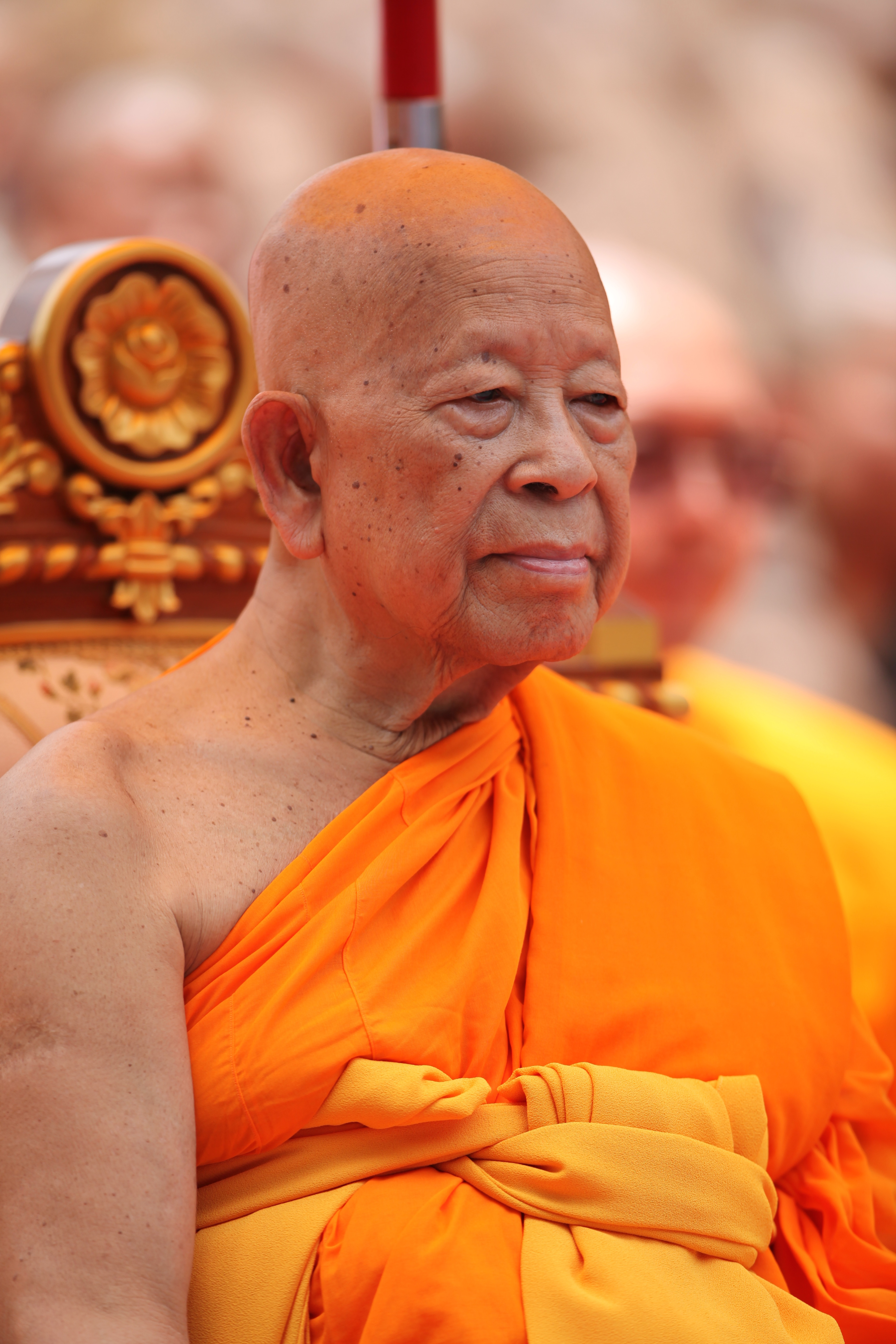
Somdet Chuang Varapuñño

Somdet Chuang, born Chuang Sutprasert, was ordained as a samanera (novice) when he was fourteen years old in 1939, in his hometown in Samutprakan. He heard about Luang Pu Sodh's reputation and aspired to move to Wat Paknam. Two years later, his teacher allowed him to do so, and he lived as a novice at Wat Paknam until he was fully ordained there in 1945, as a monk under Luang Pu Sodh. After Somdet Chuang ordained, Luang Pu Sodh saw his potential and had him continue his Pali studies and work as a secretary at Wat Benchamabophit to the fourteenth Supreme Patriarch Ariyavongsagatayana (Plod Kittisobhano), who had a reputation for strict discipline. Somdet Chuang learned about the management of temples from him. In reflection, Somdet Chuang has stated about this period that he "learned from different temples, because a temple is also a sort of teacher". After completing his Pali studies, Luang Pu Sodh had Somdet Chuang come back to Wat Paknam to learn about the work at Wat Paknam.

Somdet Chuang is known to rarely give interviews or answer questions of journalists. However, he has shown strong engagement with Thai society. In 2014, he asked the Thai government to do more to support the monks in the South, who suffer because of the insurgency there. He has also promoted ethics in Thai society, requesting television stations to remind viewers of the five Buddhist precepts during their broadcasts, and reminding viewers himself in a 2016 television broadcast of the Magha Puja festival. Since the time of his appointment as an abbot, the temple's activities have expanded, and in 1969, King Bhumibol Adulyadej led the Kathina ceremony at the temple.

Somdet Chuang used to be monastic Chief of Region in the Northeast, South and North, respectively. He later became Chief of the Northern Region and supervised missionary work abroad (ธรรมทูต, thammatut, Pali: dhammadūta), as well as Pali studies. Moreover, Somdet Chuang significantly contributed to the compiling of a special Tipitaka set in honor of King Bhumibol's sixtieth anniversary. In recognition of his merits, he received honorary degrees from the Mahachulalongkornrajavidyalaya University (MCU), Thammasart University and Sripatum University in Thailand. He received the royal honorific names Phrasrivisuddhimoli (in 1956), Phraratchavethi (in 1962), Phrathepwarawethi (in 1967), Phra Thamthirarathmahamuni (in 1973), Phrathampanyabodi (in 1987) and Phra Maha Ratchamangalacharn (in 1995). His last honorific made him officially a member of the Supreme Sangha Council. He has presided over meetings of the council since 2005, when he became the acting Supreme Patriarch.

Although the number of monks and mae chi has decreased since the time of Luang Pu Sodh, the temple still boasts a number of 200–400 monks, 80–150 novices, 160–300 mae chi ('nuns') and 30–100 resident volunteers, as reported in the 1990s and 2000s. (Note: See Newell (2008), Gosling (1998, p. 128), Falk (2007) and Chattinawat (2009, p. 52).)

=== Appointment as Supreme Patriarch stalled (2013–15) ===
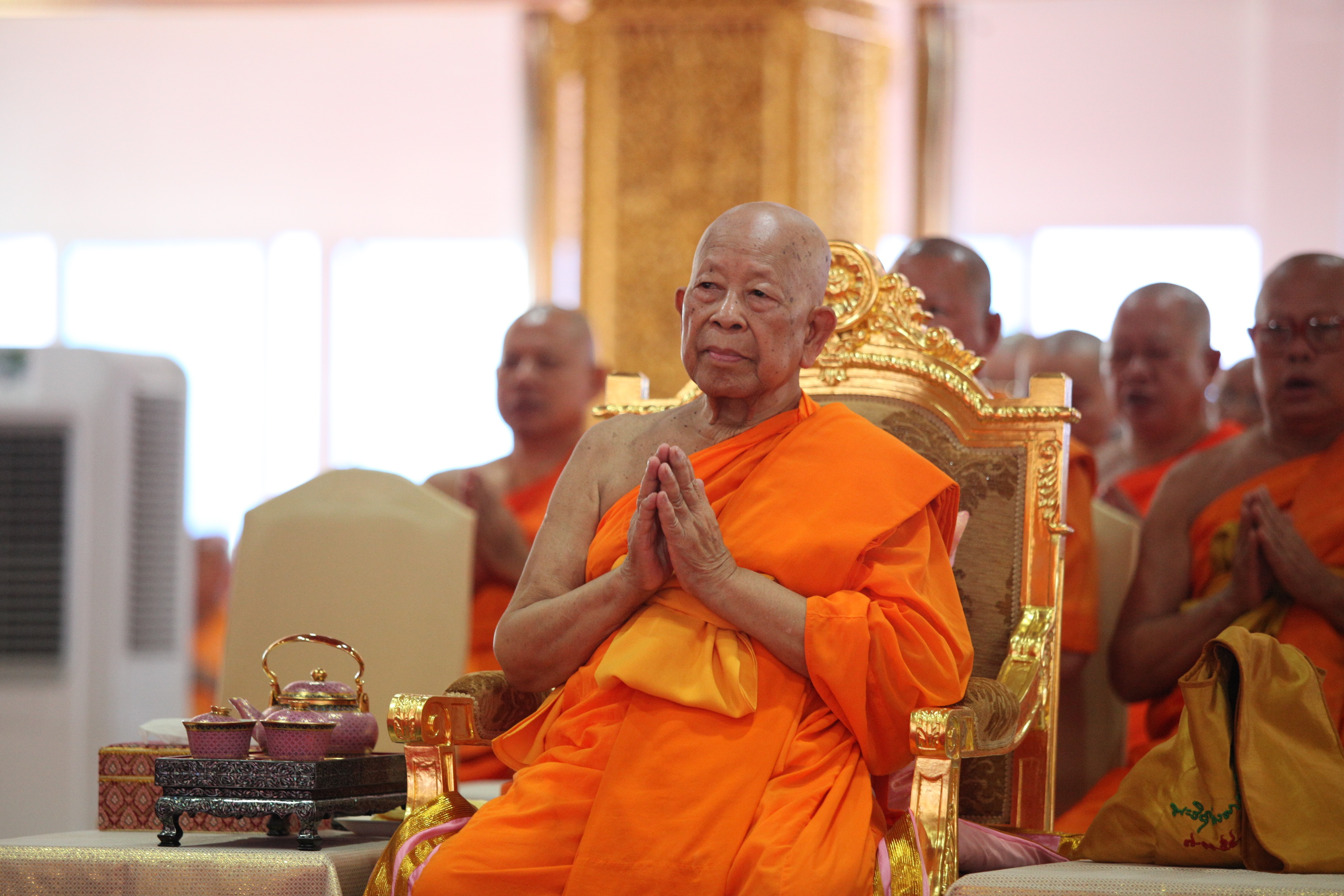
Somdet Chuang Varapuñño presiding over a ceremony

After the deaths of Somdet Phra Yanasangworn and caretaker Somdet Kiaw in 2013, Somdet Chuang became the acting Supreme Patriarch. However, he did not receive the full position, as the Thai junta refused to forward the nomination to the King for approval.

In December 2013, during the protests which led up to the 2014 coup d'état, Somdet Chuang made a public statement opposing the protests, asking protest leaders Phra Suwit Dhiradhammo and Suthep Thaugsuban to stop causing civil unrest, in respect of King Bhumibol's birthday. After the coup d'état, the junta started a National Reform Council to bring stability to Thai society, which the junta stated was required before elections could be held. As part of the council, a panel was started to reform Thai religion. This panel was led by Paiboon Nititawan, a former senator who had played a crucial role in the coup. Backed by the bureaucracy, military and Royal Palace, Paiboon sought to deal with any shortcomings in the leading Thai Sangha through legislative means. He was joined by coup leader Phra Suwit Dhiradhammo (known under the activist name Phra Phuttha Issara), a then monk and former infantryman.

On 5 January 2016, Somdet Chuang had been nominated by the Supreme Sangha Council to take the post of Supreme Patriarch officially. Phra Suwit objected to this nomination, and held a petition to stop it, which succeeded. Moreover, in February 2015, Paiboon tried to reopen the 1999 case of Luang Por Dhammajayo's alleged embezzlement of land. Somdet Chuang and the rest of the Sangha Council were also involved in this, as they were accused of being negligent in not defrocking Luang Por Dhammajayo. First, the Sangha Council reconsidered the embezzlement and fraud charges, but concluded that Luang Por Dhammajayo had not intended to commit fraud or embezzlement, and had already returned the land concerned; after that, Phra Suwit enlisted the help of the Ombudsman, who asked the General-Attorney and the National Office of Buddhism to reconsider the criminal law case of embezzlement.

Next, Phra Suwit Dhiradhammo led two hundred soldiers and civilians to pay a visit to Wat Paknam. He made an offering to Somdet Chuang and asked several critical questions with regard to the verdict of innocence of Luang Por Dhammajayo. The questions were answered by Sangha Council secretary Phra Suchat Dhammaratano on Somdet Chuang's behalf. Critics interpreted Phra Suwit's visit, followed by his PR through social media, as aggressive, disrespectful, and inappropriate for a monk, and Phra Maha Show, administrator at the MCU, filed a lawsuit against Phra Suwit. At this point, criticism against the reform panel rose. Several Thai intellectuals and news analysts asserted that Paiboon and Phra Suwit were abusing the Vinaya (monastic discipline) for political ends, and did not really aim to reform Buddhism. A number of Buddhist organizations, as well as the National Office of Buddhism, started to charge online news outlets for libel with regard to Somdet Chuang's person and spreading panic, only to be halted by Somdet Chuang himself. He stated simply: "There is no real problem, you don't have to do anything against them". In February 2016, Chao Khun Prasarn, vice-rector of the MCU, assistant abbot of Wat Mahadhatu, and proponent of Somdet Chuang's appointment, held a protest of over a thousand of Thai monks in the Phutthamonthon Park, as a response to the postponing of the appointment. He demanded that the Thai junta not interfere with the Sangha's affairs, in particular the appointment of the next Supreme Patriarch. The junta responded by sending soldiers to control the site, and it came to a few scuffles. At 9 pm, the protest was ended when the monks announced they would repeat their protests if their demands were not met. However, the junta saw the protests as another reason to stall the appointment.

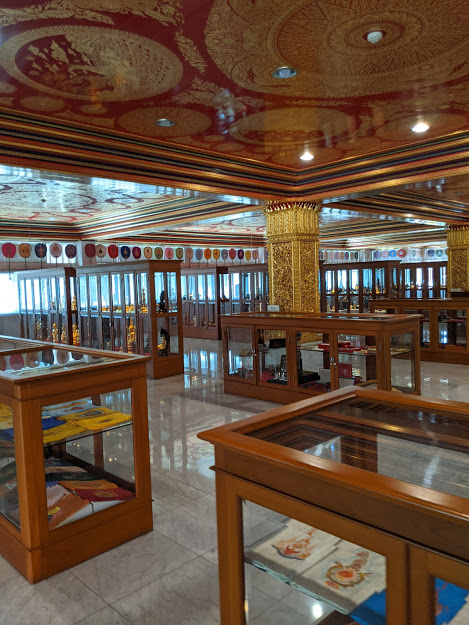
Inside the museum at Wat Paknam

In response to the rising tensions, eventually junta Prime Minister Prayuth Chan-o-cha intervened and brought an end to the attempt to revive the embezzlement case: it had already been closed in 2006 by the then Attorney-General. He also dissolved the religious panel of the reform council. Paiboon and Phra Suwit continued to address the leading Sangha's shortcomings through judicial means, however, and cited these shortcomings to support the stalling of the appointment. Meanwhile, Chao Khun Prasarn was sent to an "attitude adjustment" camp for some time. (Note: A camp designed to "re-educate" people opposing the junta.)

News analysts and scholars have suggested several underlying motivations to explain the conflicts with regard to Somdet Chuang's appointment. It has been pointed out that if Somdet Chuang were to become Supreme Patriarch, it would mean a leader from the Maha Nikaya fraternity, rather than the Dhammayuttika fraternity, which historically has always been the preferred choice by the Thai government and monarchy. They also suggested that an important reason for the stalling is that Somdet Chuang is the preceptor (the person who ordained) Luang Por Dhammajayo, abbot of Wat Phra Dhammakaya, and Wat Phra Dhammakaya has been associated with the Red Shirt pressure group, opposing the junta. As part of the junta's efforts to "de-Thaksinize" the country, i.e. free the country from former PM Thaksin's influence, Wat Paknam and Wat Phra Dhammakaya's influence had to be limited too.

The relation between Wat Paknam and Wat Phra Dhammakaya had been subject of speculation since 1999, when Wat Phra Dhammakaya was accused by Phra Adisak Viriyasakko, a former monk of Wat Phra Dhammakaya, of embezzlement and other wrongdoings through a report of television station iTV. Somdet Chuang was displeased by the report and had Phra Adisak leave Wat Paknam, but the latter asked Somdet Chuang for pardon and reconsideration. When Phra Adisak's accusations led to an investigation by the Supreme Sangha Council into Wat Phra Dhammakaya, the council decided there was no need to prosecute Luang Por Dhammajayo, but gave four directives for the abbot to practice. Somdet Chuang's role was disputed as he was both member of the council and preceptor of Luang Por Dhammajayo. In the same year, in an interview with news outlet Thai Rath, Somdet Chuang said he was not favoring Luang Por Dhammajayo, and considered all the accusations in the light of the Vinaya, as a parent would be just to his children. In 2015, nine years after the 1999 charges against Luang Por Dhammajayo had been withdrawn, Paiboon addressed Somdet Chuang's relation with Wat Phra Dhammakaya again. Paiboon pointed out that Somdet Chuang had stated he had received large donations from Wat Phra Dhammakaya for the building of the Phramaharatchamongkhon stupa, which Paiboon believed indicated a relationship of patronage. Chao Khun Prasarn defended Somdet Chuang, however, stating that Somdet Chuang's relation with Luang Por Dhammajayo was typical for a preceptor–student relationship, and that Somdet Chuang had no biases in his role as a Sangha administrator.

=== Withdrawal of appointment (2015–17) ===
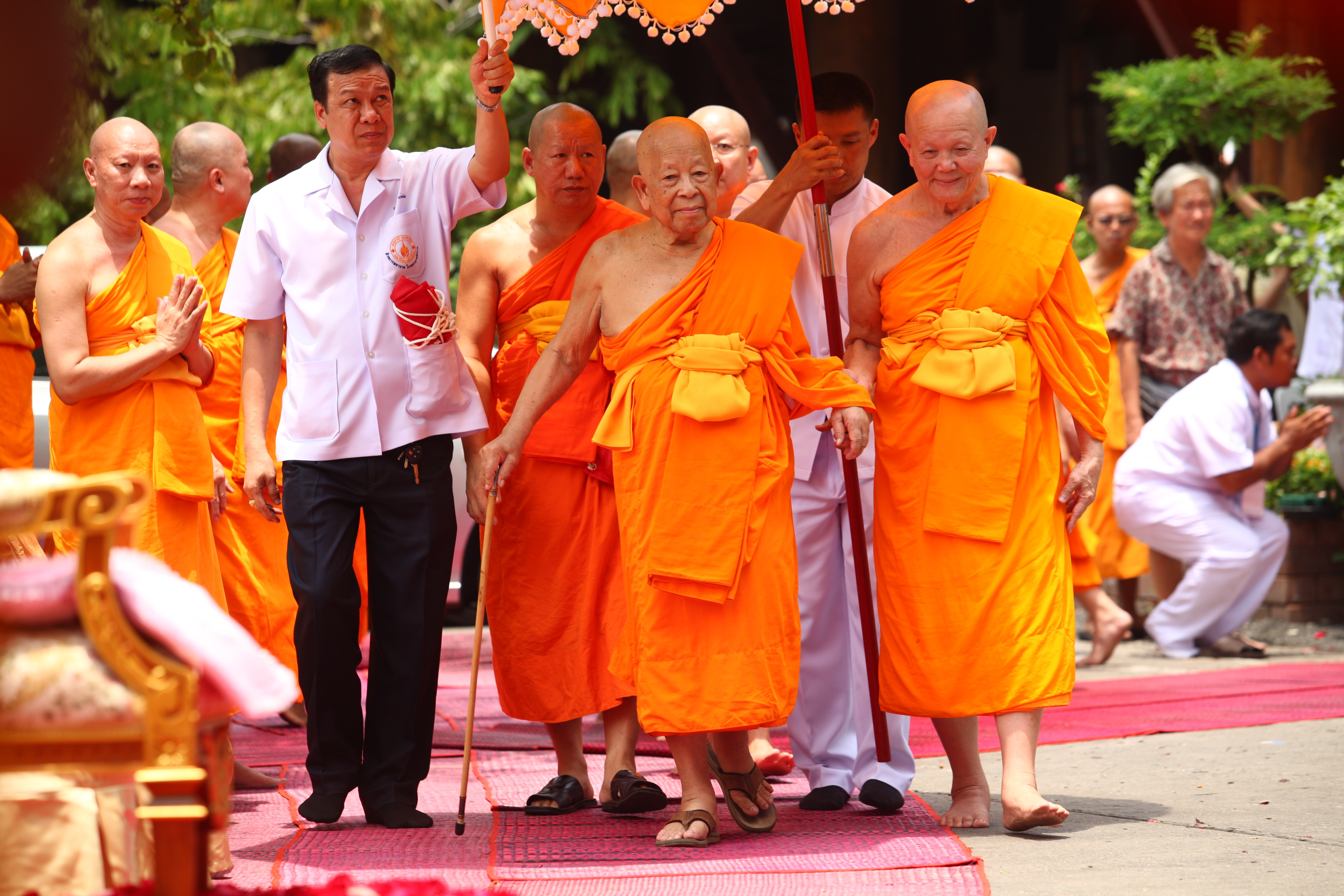
Somdet Chuang Varapuñño (left)

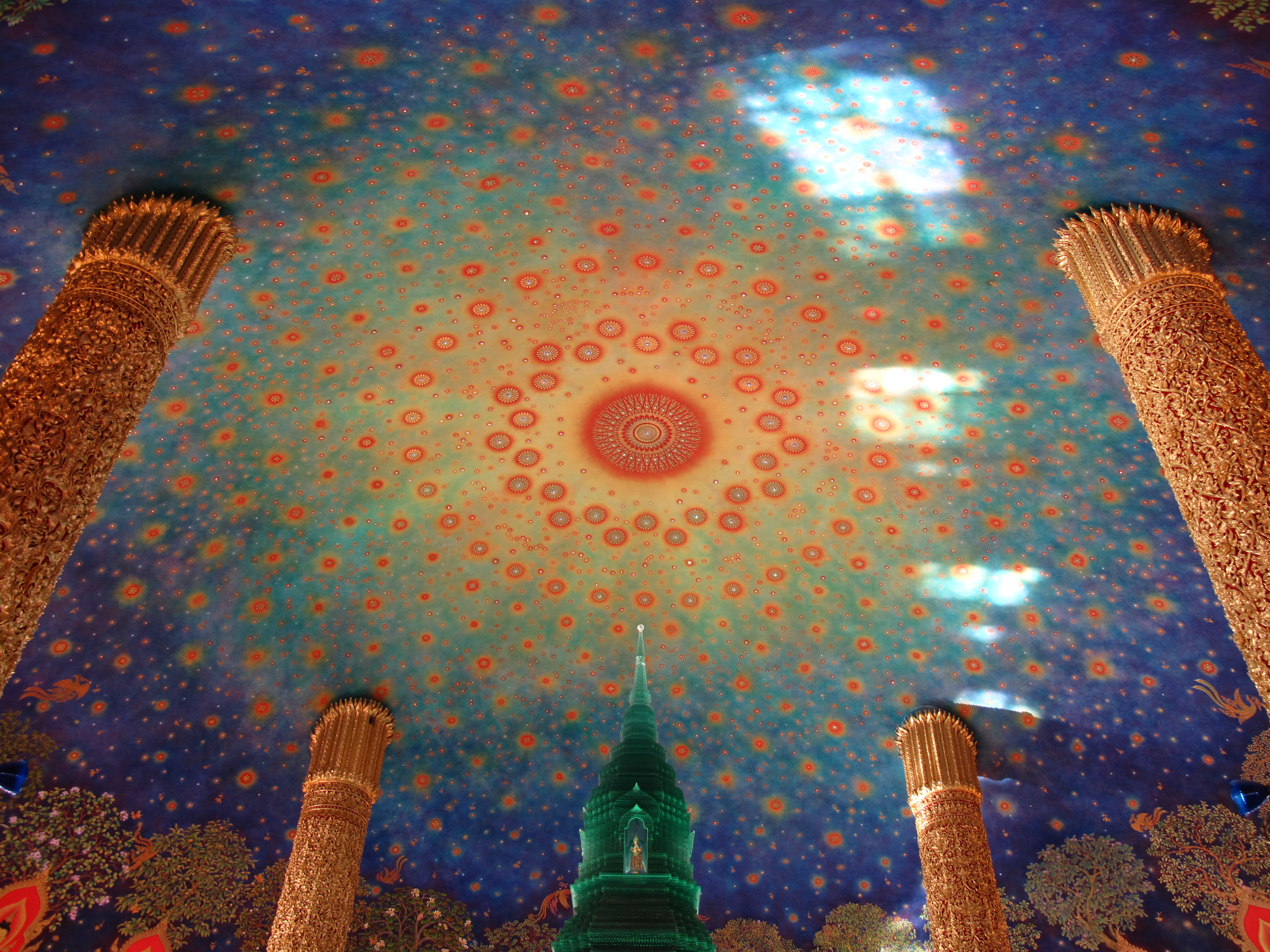
Roof of the Phrarathchamongkhon Stupa in Wat Paknam Bhasicharoen

In June 2015, Paiboon and the remaining National Reform Council submitted a number of proposals to reform the Thai Sangha, including increased control of the bank accounts of Thai temples, increased control on monastic disciplinarians, changing the abbots of all Thai temples every five years, and raising taxes for monks, who had been exempt from taxes. Although Sangha Council spokesperson Phra Suchat did understand the need for more financial control, better accounting required nationwide training of abbots, which the National Office of Buddhism had already planned to organize. Furthermore, the Sangha Council protested that the (then still existent) reform council panel should consult them more in their policy-making, and described the measures as "a possible destruction of Buddhism through indirect means". Phra Suchat further criticized the junta: "Previously, when politicians issued new laws or regulations, they did so to facilitate and honor the Sangha to make Buddhism stable in this country. But currently, politicians order monks around, even though they are not always knowledgeable in these matters." Chao Khun Prasarn intended to organize another protest, but was halted by the Sangha Council, who felt that discussion with the junta was becoming more feasible. It seemed the junta was not pushing for new Sangha legislation after all.

Meanwhile, Paiboon and Phra Suwit requested the Department of Special Investigation (DSI), sometimes considered the Thai equivalent of the American FBI, to start an investigation in the assets of the Sangha Council's members, including those of Somdet Chuang. In 2016, the DSI formally summoned Somdet Chuang, because of a vintage car no longer in use, kept in a museum at Wat Paknam. Wat Paknam had asked people to donate second-hand belongings with an educative value to the museum in the stupa. However, the car was not properly registered, which DSI believed was to evade taxes. There had been an investigation running since 2013 into the car, offered to the temple's museum, which was one of a series of 6000–7000 cars sold, and over which allegedly no tax had been paid. According to a report of newspaper Matichon, the car under investigation was an eighty-old year car that had been fixed by adding new parts to it, before offering it to the museum. Tharit Pengdit, the then director of the DSI, believed Wat Paknam not to be involved in the purported tax evasion. However, Tharit was fired and replaced after the 2014 coup d'état, and the investigation was re-opened when the National Reform Council pushed the DSI to do so. The tax evasion accusation was another reason for the junta to postpone Somdet Chuang's installment. At the same time, Paiboon argued that the nomination of Somdet Chuang by the Sangha Council had been moot from the start, because it had not been done following correct procedure. The Ombudsman agreed with this, but the Council of State dismissed the case, stating it had been done correctly.

When in July 2016 it became clear that the junta had still not submitted the appointment of the Supreme Patriarch, Chao Khun Prasarn came out to give the junta an ultimatum of seven days, after which he would "consult with his team what to do next". The junta responded by prohibiting any further gatherings, which had been prohibited under martial law anyway. If Chao Khun Prasarn still continued, he would be sued and defrocked, the junta threatened. In November, the prosecutors decided not to charge Somdet Chuang, because he was not involved in the purchase. They charged attendant Luang Phi Pae instead, and another six people who had taken part in importing the vintage car. On 12 January 2017, however, the prosecutor issued a non-prosecution order against Luang Phi Pae, since the DSI had found no evidence of conspiring to evade taxes. The order indicated innocence on the part of Wat Paknam, but followed two days after the withdrawal of Somdet Chuang's nomination as Supreme Patriarch. Paiboon responded that despite the lack of evidence against Somdet Chuang, Somdet Chuang was still not eligible to be the Supreme Patriarch. He argued that Somdet Chuang was too wealthy and had shown favor in not defrocking Luang Por Dhammajayo. At the same time, Banjob Banruchi, a Buddhist studies scholar, stated that:

People who don't agree [with the verdict] will not yet stop. But for people with some knowledge of laws and regulations, when they learn that the court, the center of Justice, has given its verdict, will they be able to accept that? ... Since Somdet Phra Maharatchamangalacharn [Somdet Chuang] has been found to be without wrongdoing, every party should consider the goodness he has done, and what he deserves to get for that.

After the first verdict of innocence, the DSI appealed. But in June 2017, the appeal failed when again no evidence could be found. Wat Paknam asked the DSI to publicly admit their wrongdoing in accusing Somdet Chuang and charging Luang Pi Pae, now that two courts had not found any evidence of their guilt. If the DSI did not respond, they would charge the DSI in response, in both a civil (phaen) and criminal (aya) lawsuit. The temple's lawyer stated that although Somdet Chuang and Luang Phi Pae had already forgiven the officers who charged them, the temple committee concluded that the temple's reputation had suffered greatly, and demanded the department take responsibility for their mistakes. The DSI responded that they "would definitely not charge" Luang Phi Pae anymore, after which Wat Paknam withdrew.

=== Amendment Monastic Act (2016–18) ===
On 29 December 2016, the National Legislative Assembly amended the 2005 Monastic Act to allow other monks than Somdet Chuang to be appointed Supreme Patriarch. Previously, this had been impossible because the law stipulated that the most senior patriarch (พระราชาคณะ, phra racha khana) of the Sangha Council had to be appointed. Under the new amendment, which was reverting the Monastic Act to its 1992 version, any of the eight patriarchs in the Sangha Council could be appointed. The law was amended within one single day, which was highly unusual. In addition to the adjustments in the nomination process, more authority was given to the King, and less to the Sangha Council. The legislative assembly stated that, apart from the role of the King, they wanted to solve further conflict in the Sangha. They therefore decided to remove the Sangha Council from the process of appointing the Supreme Patriarch. While proponents considered the amendment a good way for politicians to solve the problems the Sangha had not been able to solve, opponents described the amendment as "sneaky" (ลักไก่). Chao Khun Prasarn stated the amendment showed a grave lack of respect for the Sangha Council's authority, because the council had not been involved in the amendment at all. He argued that the Monastic Act had always given the final authority to the King anyway, and pointed out that all conflicts about the appointment were caused by the National Reform Council (the junta), not by the Sangha. Despite these objections, on 10 January 2017, the Supreme Sangha Council officially withdrew its nomination of Somdet Chuang, stating that the new amendment had made their nomination moot. However, Somdet Chuang was still the acting Supreme Patriarch. Somdet Chuang himself did not join the council meeting, citing other business to attend to. Finally in February, Somdet Amborn was appointed by King Vajiralongkorn to serve as the next Supreme Patriarch.

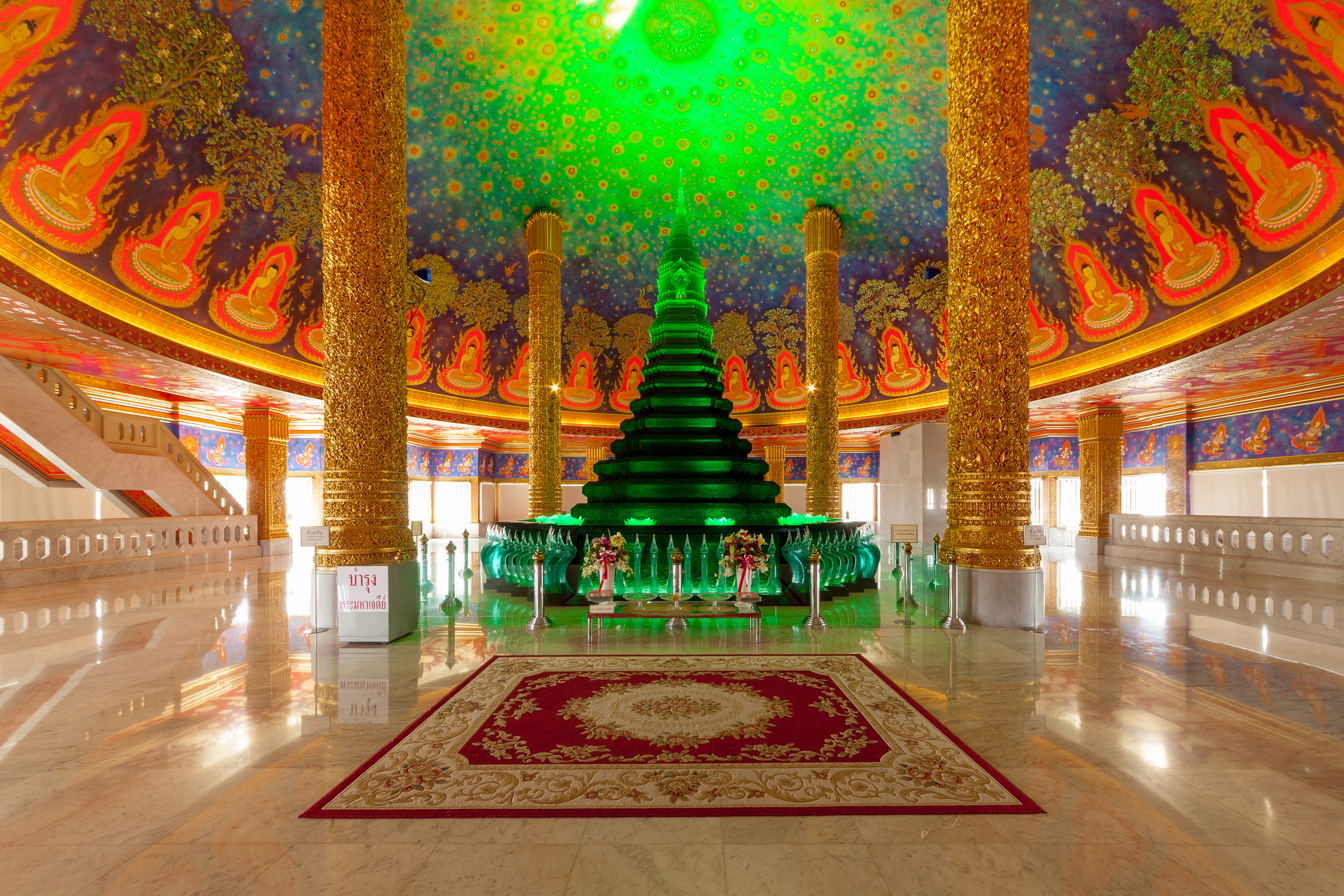
Phrarathchamongkhon Stupa in Wat Paknam Bhasicharoen

Before the withdrawal of the nomination, in 2015, Somdet Chuang retired from his supervision of missionary work abroad (พระธรรมทูต) and within Thailand (พระธรรมจาริก, phra thammacharik), as well as his position as Chief of the Northern Region. He cited his old age as reason, and denied any political motivations. Luang Por Wichian Anomaguno, deputy-abbot of Wat Paknam, was appointed as region head instead. In 2019, the Royal Thai Government Gazette announced that Somdet Chuang had retired from his position in the Sangha Council, leaving Luang Por Wichian and Phra Suchat as representatives of Wat Paknam on the assembly.

=== Investigations by AMLO (2017–18) ===
On 5 July 2017, as part of the ongoing 2017–2020 Thai temple fraud investigations, Somdet Chuang, assistant abbot Phra Prommolee and Wat Paknam's accountant were questioned by the Anti-Money Laundering Office (AMLO). Held at a national scale, the investigations aimed to check whether there were any illegal deals between the National Office of Buddhism and Buddhist temples that asked for or received their funding. Wat Paknam's lawyer Somsak Toraksa did confirm that the temple had received five million baht government funding for renovation of buildings, and another sum of money for other activities. The second sum was estimated by the AMLO to also amount to five million baht. Somsak stated, however, that Wat Paknam had made no illegal deals with corrupt government officers to return money to them. The National Office of Buddhism had contributed the money themselves in 2004–2005, without Wat Paknam making any request for such funding. The lawyer further attested that all financial transactions had been properly recorded. (Note: See "ทนาย'สมเด็จช่วง'ออกโรง ยันวัดปากน้ำไม่มีเงินทอน" [Lawyer Somdet Chuang comes forward, affirms Wat Paknam did not receive fraudulent money]. Daily News (in Thai). 7 July 2017. Archived from the original on 4 January 2020 Alt URL, Purahong, Kirati (9 July 2017). "แกะปมเงินทอน "วัดปากน้ำ" พศ.ล้อมคอกงบฯ 2.6 พันล้าน" [Analyzing fraud at Wat Paknam: NOB takes a good look at 2.6 M funding]. Now26 (in Thai) and "ทนายแจง'วัดปากน้ำภาษีเจริญ'ไม่เอี่ยวทุจริตเงินทอน" [Lawyer states that Wat Paknam Bhasicharoen is not involved in funding fraud]. TNN (Video) (in Thai). 6 July 2017. For the accounting, the dates, the amount of money and its purpose, see the Now 26 and TNN reports. For the people questioned, see "ทนายวัดปากน้ำเคลียร์ข่าว "เงินทอน"" [Lawyer Wat Paknam clears up questions about affair temple fraud]. Spring News (Video) (in Thai). 6 July 2017. 10:30. Archived from the original on 21 December 2021.) The next day, the AMLO indicated investigations in Wat Paknam were still continuing, though they were nearly over. Junta-appointed director of the National Office Of Buddhism Pongporn Pramsaneh stated later that the AMLO investigations in Wat Paknam were part of a protocol investigation and there were no particular suspicions with regard to Wat Paknam. Apart from Wat Paknam, four other large temples in Bangkok were under investigation.

In December 2021, Somdet Chuang died, aged 96. Phra Phrom Moli, Somdet Chuang's assistant abbot, was then named acting abbot.

== Practices and propagation ==
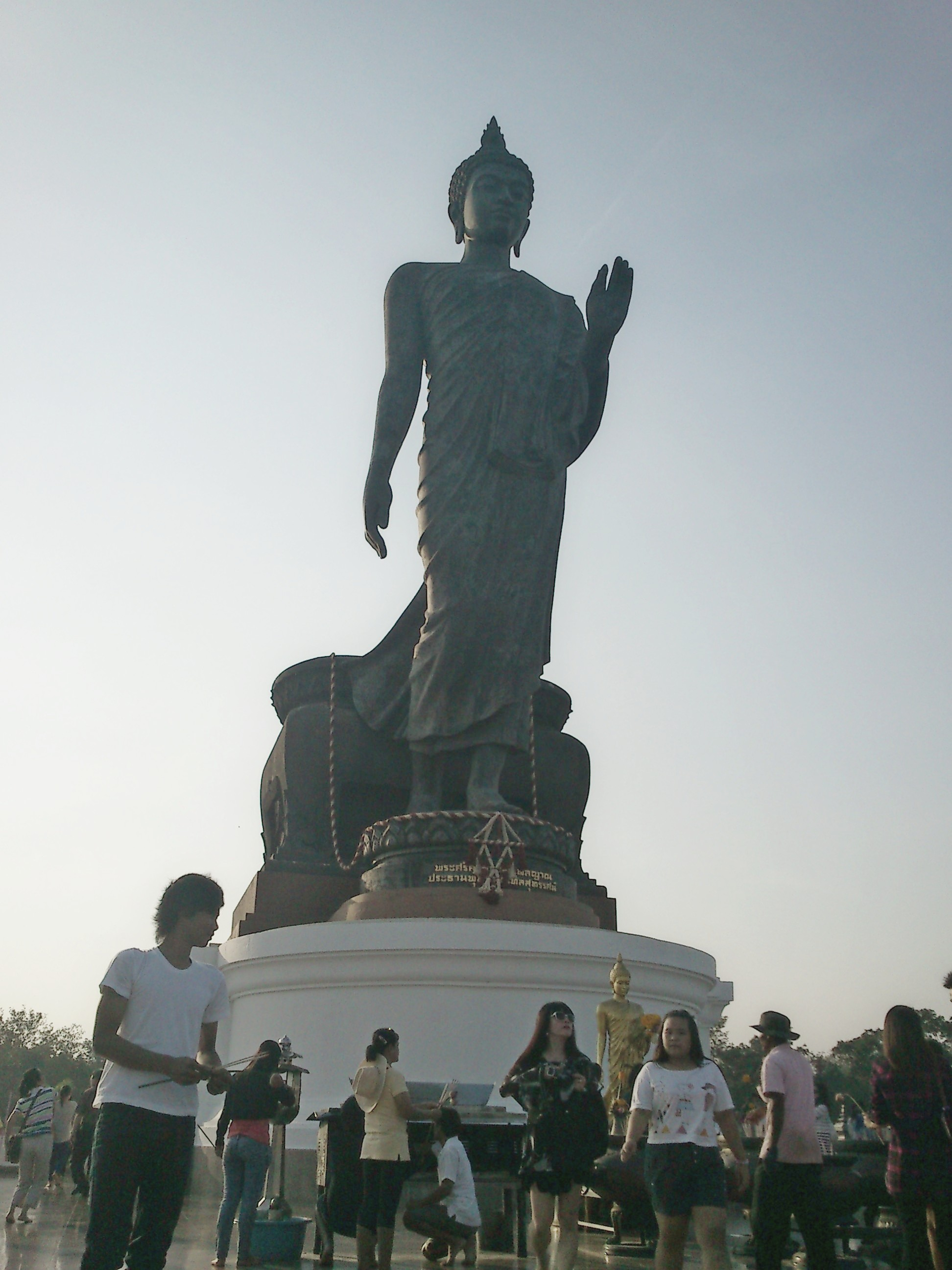
Somdet Chuang has planned to replace the standing Buddha image in the Phutthamonthon Park, which was deteriorating.

The temple has in several ways promoted Buddhist education in Thailand. The temple has a well-known Pali and Buddhist studies institute, which is used by the Sangha to print documents used for national monastic examinations. This Pali Institute was already built by Luang Pu Sodh in 1939, and in his time was already a learning center with a thousand monks and samaneras studying there. As of 2011, Wat Paknam still had a leading position in Pali studies. As a monastic administrator, Somdet Chuang has endeavored to increase the level of Pali studies in Thailand, especially in the provinces. He has described Pali as the root of the tree of Buddhism, that should be well taken care of. Wat Paknam has also established initiatives for the Thai Sangha to work on illiteracy in Thailand, through increased education in Thai language.

Somdet Chuang has made several contributions to the Phutthamonthon, a national park used as a center for Buddhism. In 2000, he built a pavilion in it with fragments from the Tipitaka carved in marble, as well as a stupa with relics, and a library. Also, he has planned to replace the standing Buddha image in the park, which was deteriorating. The new image is to stand 145 meters (476 ft) tall. Buddha images in Japan were studied as examples for the construction, as the Thai Society of Police was enlisted for help in fundraising. The project was started in 2012, to celebrate 2560 years since the Buddha's enlightenment (Buddha Jayanti, following the Buddhist Era). The project was also promoted as a way to help Thailand become the center of Buddhism in the world.

Wat Paknam attracts mae chi, because of Luang Pu Sod's policies, which provide opportunities and flexibility. The temple is attractive because it emphasizes meditation, offers free dormitories for mae chi, free Buddhist and secular studies, and a stipend of eight hundred baht per month. The temple therefore has the largest mae chi community in Bangkok, and as of 1993, the largest in Thailand.

The temple has had a significant impact on female Buddhist practice: the National Thai Nun's Institute was founded by Mae chi Puk from Wat Paknam, who has also led the institute for a long time. Mae chi Chandra Khonnokyoong became the teacher of Luang Por Dhammajayo, and together with him founded Wat Phra Dhammakaya. In addition, Voramai Kabilsingh, the first bhikkhuni (fully ordained nun) in Thailand, used to be a practitioner at the temple when still a laywoman, and her daughter, bhikkhuni Dhammananda, has indicated her meditation teaching was inspired by Dhammakaya meditation. Kabilsingh has stated that the temple provides opportunities for mae chi to develop a role in the public as a healer through meditation. There are mae chi with three kinds of responsibility at the temple: meditation (called "Dhammakaya mae chi"), study, or helping with daily facilitating chores, for example at the kitchen. Although women all go through the same process to become mae chi, such as changing their names to fit their new spiritual life, the responsibility mae chi are assigned to affects what their daily routine looks like. Thus, the usual problem of mae chi having an ambiguous role in society is coped with by giving the mae chi a specific set of duties, and therefore a certain role and status. Nevertheless, the mae chi still face hardship in their daily livelihood, as is true in most Thai temples.

The temple's policy is to make itself 'suitable' (Pali: sappaya), meaning that it attempts to be attractive in terms of food, accommodation and teachings. (Note: This does not mean, however, that the temple never knew times of hardship.) Wat Paknam has grown more popular among the Bangkok lay community since the time of Luang Pu Sodh. As of 2013, there was a queue of 540 years to be the chairman of the yearly Kathina ceremony at the temple, which requires a donation. This is a highly unusual long queue. Supporters therefore donate to allow future family members to lead the ceremony.

Besides the abbot, the temple is managed by two deputy abbots, Luang Por Wichian Anomaguno and Luang Por Vira Ganutamo, specialized in religious learning and meditation respectively. Each residence and public building has its own head, with one head taking care of twenty monks or novices. Mae chi have their own head who reports to the abbot and the National Thai Nun's Institute. In administrative matters, Somdet Chuang is assisted by Phra Suchat Dhammaratano, who leads a secretariat to the Supreme Sangha Council.

=== Teachings ===
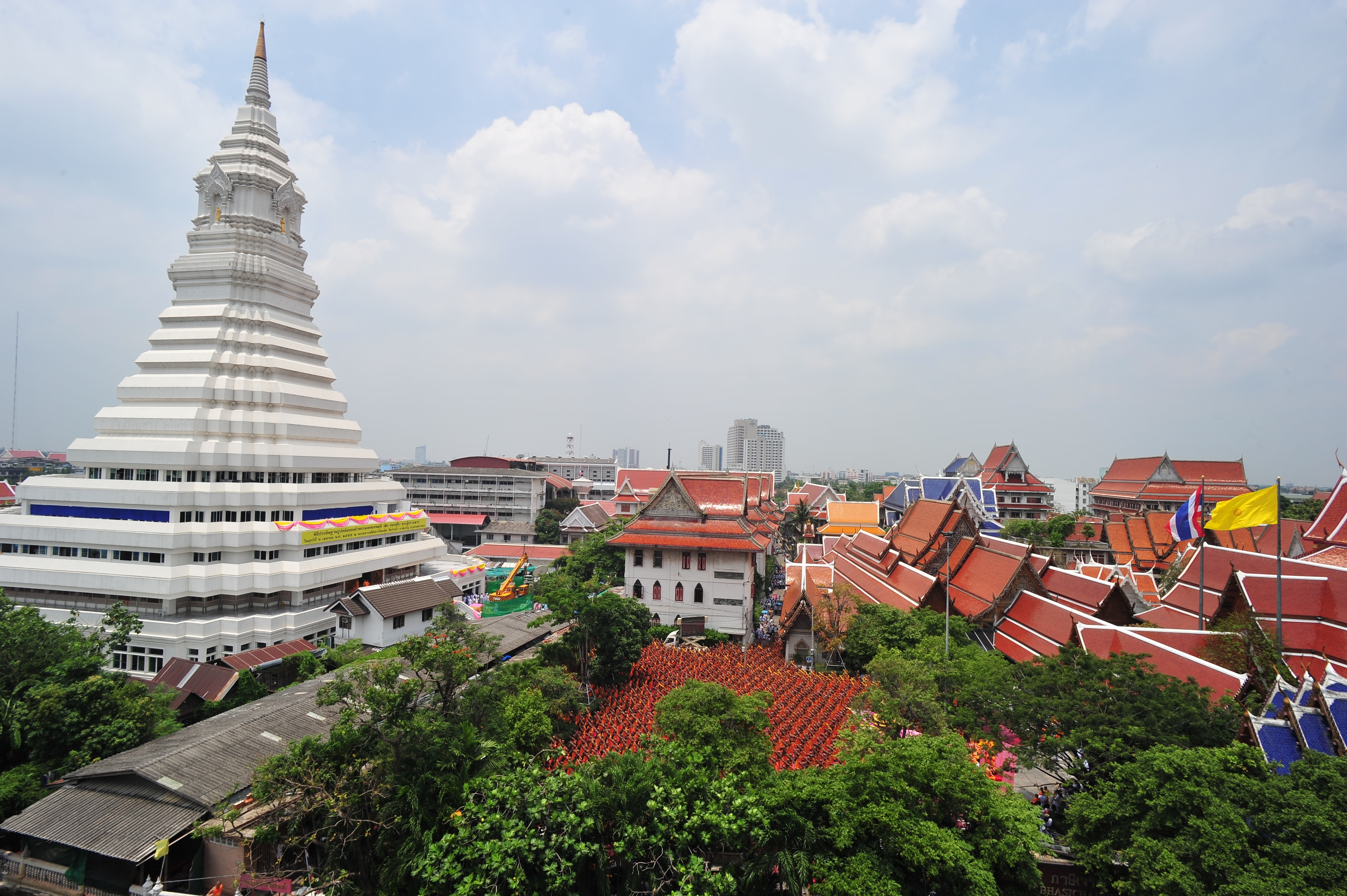
Wat Paknam is a 32,000 square metres (7.9 acres) temple complex, with a large number of buildings.

The temple has a reputation for having made Dhammakaya meditation widely known in Thailand, through monks and lay teachers. The monastics at the temple spend much time on meditation. Moreover, the temple is trying to keep the traditions of Luang Pu Sodh alive. Just as in the time of Luang Pu Sodh, there still is an evening meditation during which the practitioners listen to a tape of Luang Pu Sodh. There is also still meditation in shifts, as in the time when Luang Pu Sodh ran a 'meditative knowledge factory' (โรงงานทำวิชชา, rong ngan tham witcha). In memory of Luang Pu Sodh, the temple runs a society of "students of Luang Pu Sodh".

Many of Somdet Chuang's public talks have been published in newspapers. Somdet Chuang often teaches about themes such as living in unity, gratitude, and mindfulness. In teachings to monastics, Somdet Chuang emphasizes upholding discipline, making the Buddhist temple attractive for the public, and, in times of crisis, to engage in charity and offer solace to the public. As a Sangha administrator, he has been credited with solving issues of unity in the Sangha. He has also spoken out and acted against monks using motor bikes, smoking and other disciplinary matters, and has attempted to fix problems in the monastic community, such as incorrect teachings, lack of thoroughness in ordination procedures. and lack of knowledge of modern law. In 2014, after the coup d'état, junta leader Prayut consulted Somdet Chuang as acting Supreme Patriarch, which is a custom for new prime ministers. Somdet Chuang emphasized restoring and managing the environment better, promoting unity and honesty in society, through upholding the five precepts. Three months later, when the just-ousted former PM Yingluck came to see Somdet Chuang, he recommended her to be patient and enduring, and not to be affected too much by outer circumstances.

In 2014, Somdet Chuang started promoting the five precepts through a nationwide program The Villages Practicing the Five Precepts (หมู่บ้านรักษาศีล ๕, muban raksa sin ha). In this program, held in cooperation with the National Office of Buddhism, villages are encouraged to agree on adhering to the five precepts unanimously. Villages that have one in two inhabitants participating receive a sign to announce their intentions to the outside world. Evaluations are held per monastic administrative region, and awards are given to exemplary villages that have eighty percent of villagers participating. Schools and colleges, local administration, Sangha and private companies are all involved in promotion and practice. Similar programs have been held in Thailand since 1978, but never at this scale. The program has inspired a number of initiatives, for example, the promotion of five precepts among prisoners, and promotion of a vegetarian lifestyle. The organisers of the program have claimed that crime has decreased in areas which joined the program. In an interview with newspaper Matichon, Somdet Chuang's attendant Luang Phi Pae said that of all Buddhist teachings, Somdet Chuang would like to propagate the teaching of the five precepts the most. In 2017, the National Office of Buddhism claimed that over 60% of Thailand's population was now involved in the program, amounting to more than 39 million people. As of 2019, the program was still being run by the Sangha Council, and awards were being given to exemplary villages and cities.

=== Charity ===
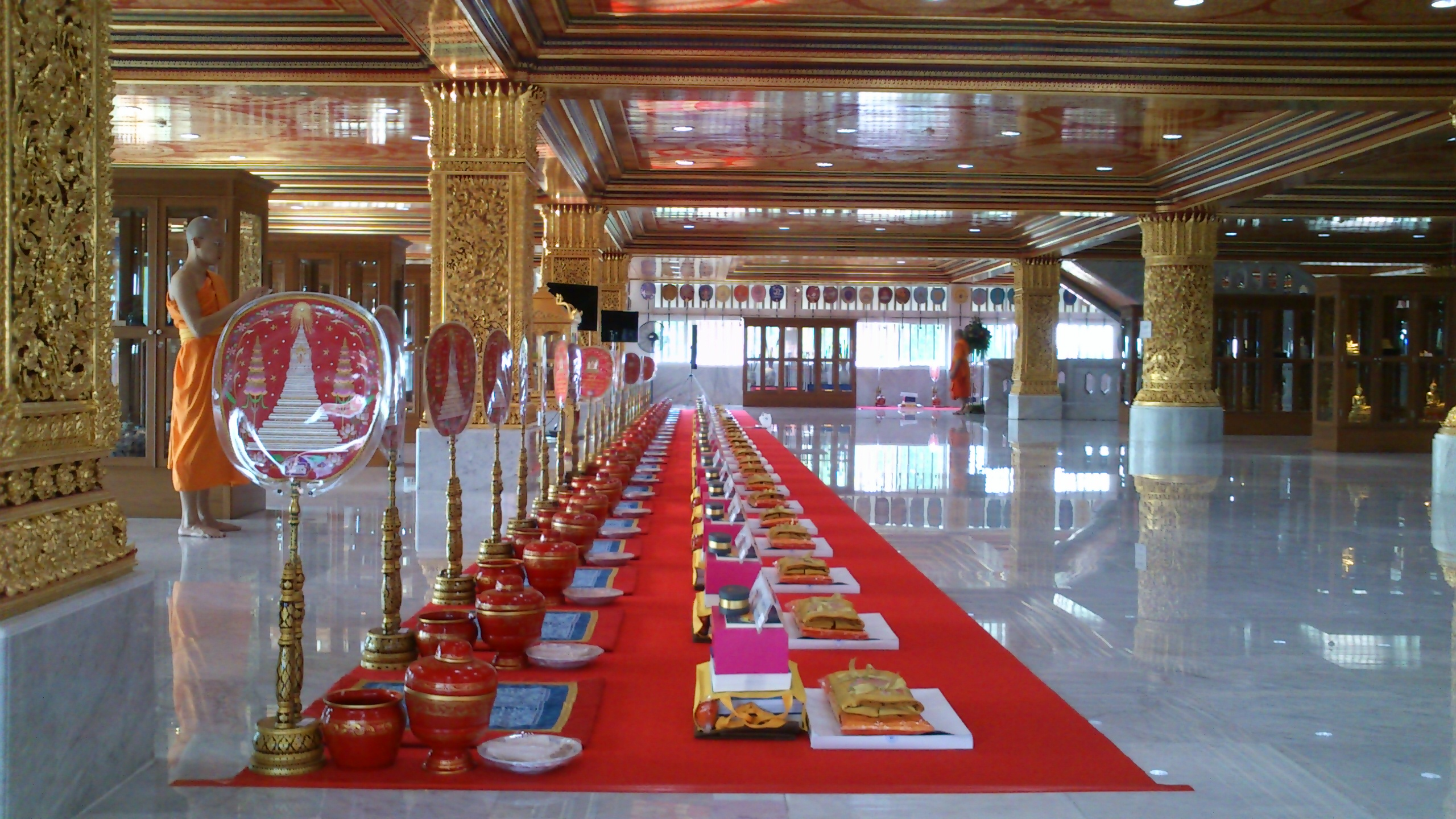
Preparing a ceremony for offering necessities to the Sangha (monastic community)

Under Somdet Chuang's supervision, Wat Paknam has established the Luang Por Wat Paknam Foundation, aimed at charity for educational projects, construction, and charity. Led largely by meditation mae chi, the foundation also supports education for monastics. Moreover, it has helped people hit by the 2011 floods in Thailand and Somdet Chuang has traveled to offer charity to the affected areas of the 2015 earthquake in Nepal, in cooperation with the organization Hands 4 Nepal.

Wat Paknam has organized a number of activities to promote and support public health. Since 1973, Wat Paknam has organized three-monthly blood donations at the temple, in cooperation with the Red Cross and the National Blood Donation Center. The idea was developed by Phrakhru Chai Kittisaro, assistant to Somdet Chuang. Somdet Chuang made the project well known by persuading people throughout the country to donate blood. Wat Paknam received three prizes for their contributions to blood donation, from Princess Soamsavali and Princess Sirindhorn (the latter as chairman of the Red Cross), and from Supreme Patriarch Phra Yanasangworn. From 2005 onward, people could also register for organ, tissue, bone and eye donation. Phrakhru Chai has described the donations as a higher form of practicing goodness (Pali: upapārami). As of June 2014, the blood donations were still held frequently. Wat Paknam also organizes free health check-ups for the local community. In 2013, local policy makers developed a plan to build a hospital in Don Muang, Bangkok, named the "Luang Por Wat Paknam Hospital". It is built on property of Wat Paknam. As of September 2015, the area was still being rented, and negotiations with tenants were in progress.

=== International presence ===
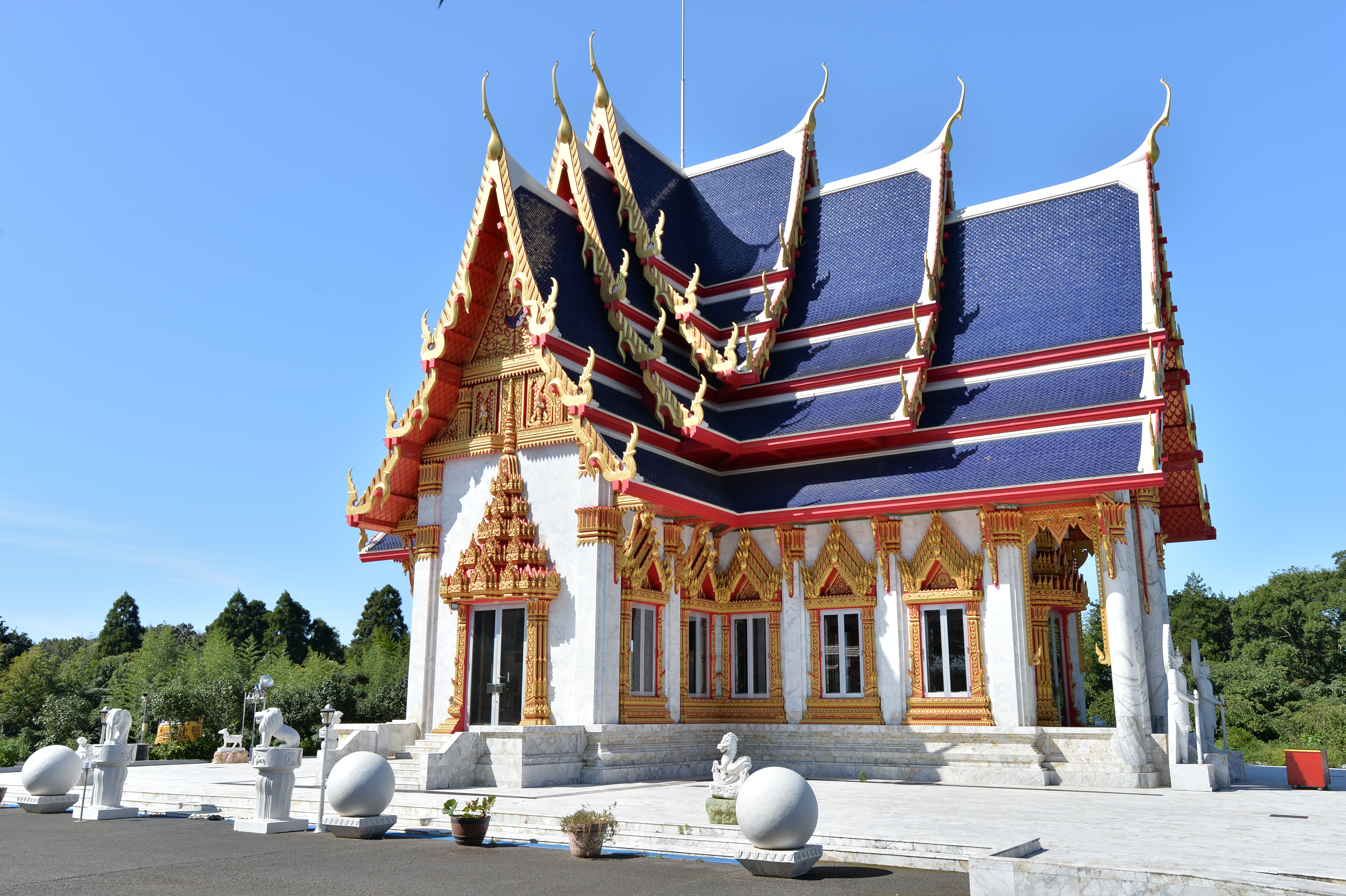
Wat Paknam Japan, Ubosot hall

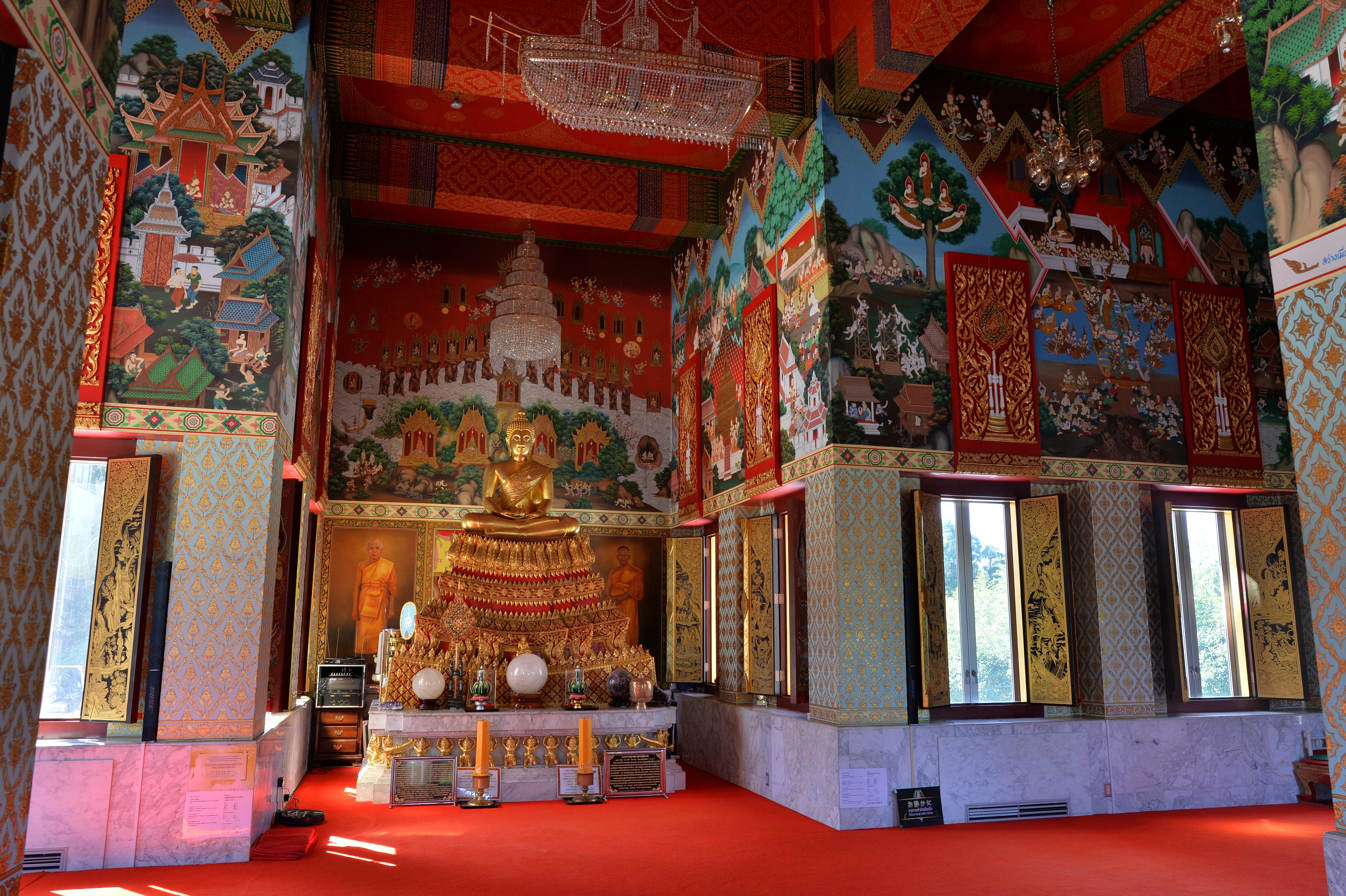
Wat paknam Japan, Ubosot hall inside

With regard to international activities, in Somdet Chuang's words, he "continued upon the work of the previous abbot, (...) Luang Pu Sodh Wat Paknam". In the time of Luang Pu Sodh, the temple ordained several monks coming from the United Kingdom, and maintained relations with Japanese Buddhists, especially from the Shingon tradition. Under Somdet Chuang, the temple has ordained people from other nationalities than Thai, both monks and mae chi. Moreover, Wat Paknam has established seven branch centers, both in Thailand and outside of Thailand, in the United States, New York, Los Angeles, Michigan and Philadelphia; and in New Zealand, India and Japan as well. The temples in the United States, some of which are former Christian churches, have been founded from 1984 onward. The temples attract Thai people, as well as Laotians and Cambodians. The international centers mainly emphasize meditation practice.

The Japanese temple, Wat Paknam Japan, has a traditional Thai appearance, 32,000 square metres (7.9 acres) wide, with a classic Thai Ubosot hall. In 1957, Luang Pu Sodh had already planned to found a temple in Japan, after a Japanese had been ordained as a monk at Wat Paknam. Luang Pu Sodh died in 1959, and was not able to finish his plans, building only the foundations of a temple in Japan. Several more Japanese were ordained during the time Somdet Pun was abbot. Finally, under the guidance of Somdet Chuang, a full-fledged temple was started in Japan in 1997, through the support of Thai and Japanese. Ceremonies at the temple are joined by 300–400 people, on average, and just like the main temple, people wanting to lead the yearly Kathina ceremonies are reserving many years in advance. Apart from traditional Buddhist ceremonies and meditation, the temple teaches Thai culture, arts and language. The Japan temple has engaged in several charity programs. During the Japanese tsunami in 2011 and the 2016 Kumamoto earthquakes, the temple provided shelter and aid, (Note: For 2011, see ยกย่องวัดปากน้ำประเทศญี่ปุ่นเป็นวัดต้นแบบช่วยเหลือสังคมยามทุกข์ยาก [Praising Wat Paknam in Japan as example of aid during crisis]. Khao Sod (in Thai). Matichon Publishing Group. 8 June 2011. p. 32 and Sarnsamak, Pongphon (24 March 2011). "Doctor learns lessons of survival". The Nation. p. 15A. For 2016, see "'สมเด็จช่วง' เปิดวัดปากน้ำญี่ปุ่น ช่วยคนไทยประสบแผ่นดินไหว เกาะคิวชู" [Somdet Chuang opens up Wat Paknam Japan to help Thai people suffering from earthquake in Kyushu]. Thai Rath (in Thai). 17 April 2016. Archived from the original on 1 March 2020. Alt URL) and a medical center was established within the temple, staffed with medical personnel from Thailand. Moreover, the main temple of Wat Paknam in Thailand requested the Thai Sangha nationwide to provide aid to Japan through Wat Paknam Japan. The center has a good relation with the Shinnyo-en movement, and has run charity programs with the movement, such as aid for the victims of the flooding in South Thailand. In recognition of the temple's importance, Wat Paknam Japan was selected as one of the seven temples of the Chiba Prefecture worth visiting, according to Thai newspapers.

Wat Paknam has donated considerably to some Thai temples abroad, and has from 2015 onward set up Pali study exams in the United States. Somdet Chuang has also set up cooperative initiatives with Sri Lankan temples, including an ordination program for Sri Lankans in Thailand, and the building of memorials in Sri Lanka at several places of historical significance. In recognition of his merits, Somdet Chuang has received honorific titles from the Sri Lankan, Bangladeshi and Burmese Sanghas.

== Layout and construction ==
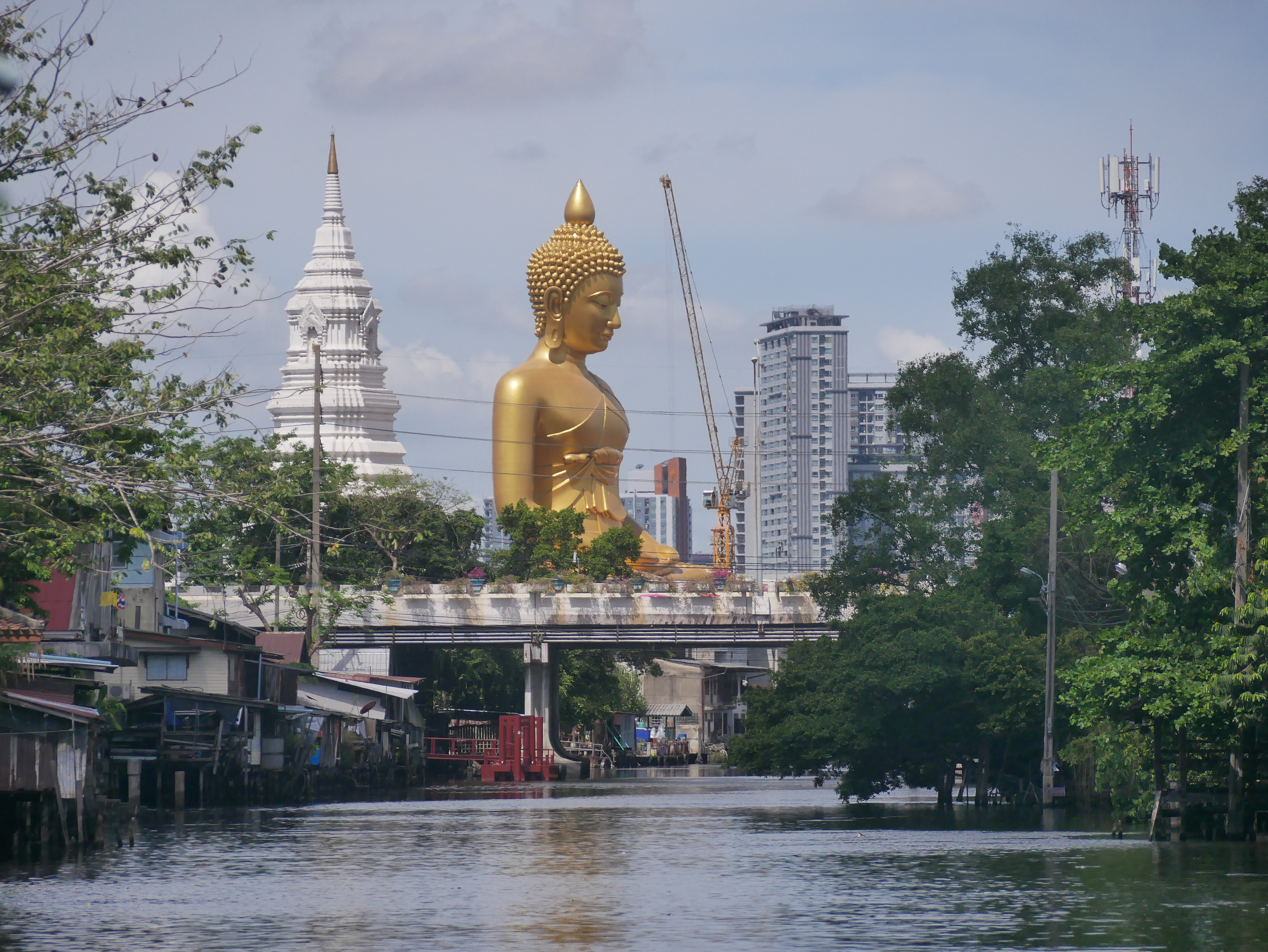
The Phra Buddha Dhammakāya Thepmongkhon

Wat Paknam is a 32,000 square metres (7.9 acres) temple complex, with a large number of buildings. Wat Paknam's oldest sections, such as the Buddha image in the ubosoth and the ho trai, still reveal its Ayutthaya origins and style. The temple's grounds are shaped like an island, surrounded by canals. The temple has a clear separation of the living areas for monks and mae chi. There is a kitchen that supplies the food for the inhabitants, a system which was in place since the time of Luang Pu Sodh. Considering the large number of temples in the area, and the dispersed, urban community that supports Wat Paknam, a kitchen has been more convenient than the traditional alms round. Nevertheless, monks of the temple do still go on alms rounds. Since he took his post as abbot, Somdet Chuang has been active in renovating the constructions at the temple complex, for which there was no expertise available during the time Somdet Pun was caretaker abbot.

In 2004, Somdet Chuang took the initiative to start building a huge stupa at the temple, named "Maharatchamongkhon" (มหารัชมงคล). The name means 'a blessed, great land', and refers to Thailand under the reign of the Royal Family, to which the stupa has been dedicated. It also refers to Somdet Chuang's honorary name. The 80 meters (260 ft) high stupa has a twelve-sided polygon shape with five floors in it, including another 8-meter glass stupa, a room with relics, Buddha images and images of respected monks, including that of Luang Pu Sodh.

The structure also contains a meditation hall, a museum, a parking lot, and a lift. (Note: See ถวายปริญญาศิลปศาสตรดุษฎีบัณฑิตกิตติมศักดิ์ แด่สมเด็จพระมหารัชมังคลาจารย์ [Offering an Honorary Arts Degree to Somdet Phra Maha Ratchamangalacharn]. Thai Rath (in Thai). Wacharapol. 2 April 2014, สมเด็จวัดปากน้ำพาชม มหาเจดีย์มหารัชมงคล [The Somdet of Wat Paknam shows the great stupa Maharatchamangkhon]. Khao Sod (in Thai). Matichon Publishing. 8 June 2011. p. 31 and ทอดผ่าป่าวัดปากน้ำสร้างมหาเจดีย์ [Thot Pha Pa ceremony for building a large pagoda]. Khao Sod (in Thai). Matichon Publishing. 1 February 2005. p. 40. For the 8 meter measurement, see "อลังการ 500 ล้าน! เปิดกรุพระมหาเจดีย์ ส่องพิพิธภัณฑ์ เว่อร์วังฉบับวัดปากน้ำ" [500 million, that's impressive: the great stupa revealed, amazing palace-like museum in Wat Paknam]. Thai Rath (in Thai). 20 February 2016. Archived from the original on 12 September 2019.) The design is partly based on the shape of Luang Pu Sodh's well-known amulets, and partly on the stupa of Wat Lok Moli in Chiangmai, showing both Rattanakosin and Lanna style influences. Within the top of the Maharatchamongkhon stupa, Pali phrases have been carved into gold, praising mindfulness, moderation, and the upholding of the five precepts. The halls within the stupa have been decorated with paintings depicting Buddhist cosmology, based on the legend of Phra Malai and the ancient text Traibhumikatha. The life of Luang Pu Sodh and that of Somdet Chuang are also depicted. The stupa was finished in 2012, costing a total of 500 million baht. It was officially opened by then Princess Srirasmi. After the stupa was finished, Wat Paknam has become a popular attraction for international tourists.

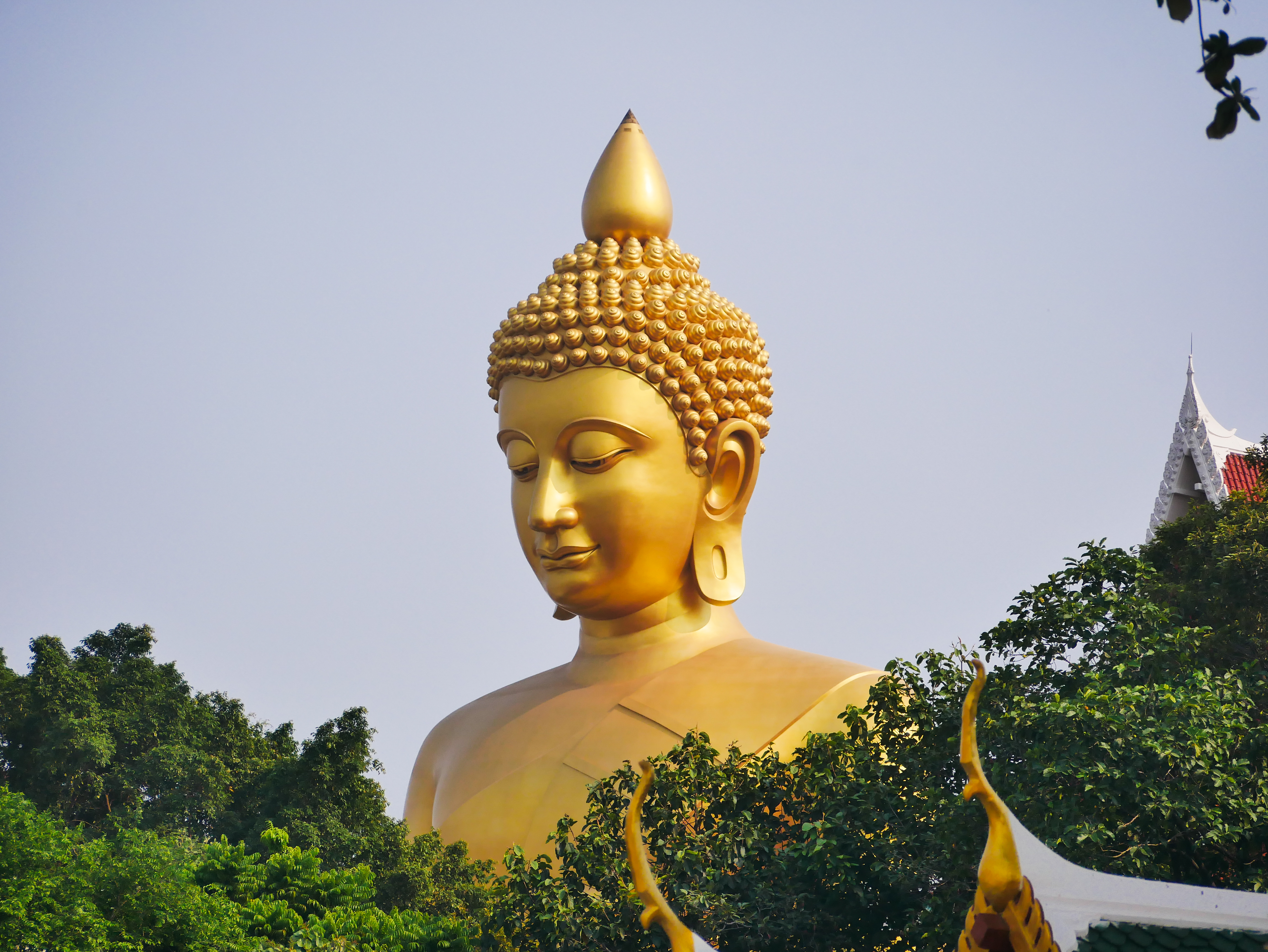
Wat Paknam's completed Buddha statue

On March 4, 2017, Wat Paknam began building a Buddha image in honor of Luang Pu Sodh and the Thai Royal Family. Called "Phra Buddha Dhammakāya Thepmongkhon", the image is 69 meters (226 ft) tall and 40 meters (130 ft) wide, and is located before the stupa. (Note: See วัดปากน้ำ สร้างพระพุทธรูป สูง69เมตร [Wat Paknam builds a Buddha image 69 meter tall]. Thai Rath (in Thai). Wacharapol. 5 March 2017. Archived from the original on 21 November 2017, อายุวัฒนมงคล 92 ปี สมเด็จฯวัดปากน้ำ [Somdet Wat Paknam celebrates his 92nd birthday]. Thai Rath (in Thai). Wacharapol. 26 August 2017. Archived from the original on 21 November 2017. For the width of the image, see "สมเด็จวัดปากน้ำอายุวัฒนมงคลครบรอบ 92 ปี" [Somdet Wat Paknam celebrates his 92nd birthday]. Daily News (in Thai). 25 August 2017. Archived from the original on 4 January 2020. Alt URL For the deadline and the name of the image, see "บรรจุ'ดอกบัวสัตตบงกช-หัวใจ'ในพระพุทธธรรมกายฯ" [Inserting the pink lotus: The heart of the Buddha's Dhammakāya]. Daily News (in Thai). 29 December 2019. Archived from the original on 4 January 2020.) The image is made in meditation posture and is based on the Buddha image as used in the meditation method by Luang Pu Sodh. According to a spokesperson of the temple, the material the image is made of is pure bronze, making the image the first of its kind in the world.

The construction is a cooperation between Thai and Chinese construction technicians. It was finished with the placing of a relic and gold in the lotus bud on the head of the Buddha, and a structure of gold as a "heart" in the left side of the chest.

The image was expected to be finished in mid 2020, but was delayed in part because of the COVID-19 pandemic in Thailand. The statue was completed in 2021 and stands tall over the city, easily visible from the BTS. Temple officials have stated that the statue has doubled the number of visitors to Wat Paknam.

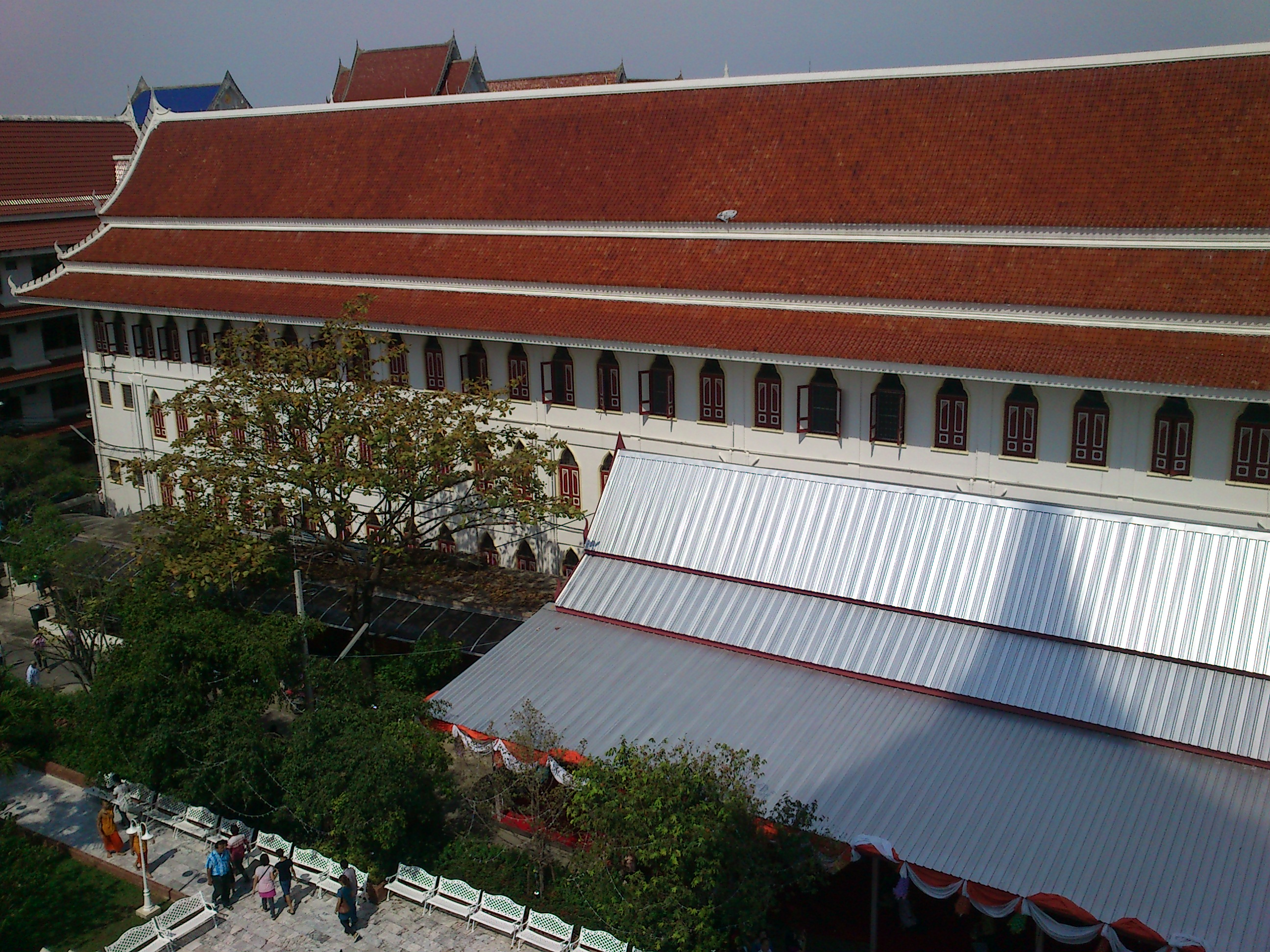
The temple clearly separates the living areas for monks and mae chi.
