= Wat Onoi =

Buddhist temple in Thailand

- Location within Thailand

Religion
- Affiliation: Buddhism
- Sect: Theravāda

Location
- Country: Nakhon Pathom province, Thailand

Architecture
- Founder: Phra Buddha Issara
- Completed: 1989

Wat Onoi (Thai: วัดอ้อน้อย) is a Maha Nikaya Buddhist temple in Nakhon Pathom province, Thailand. It was constructed in 1989 in honor of King Bhumibol Adulyadej's 72nd birthday.

== History ==
The temple was founded as an independent monastery.

=== Arrest of Phra Buddha Issara ===
At around 6:00 AM on 24 May 2018, armed police commandos stormed the temple to arrest abbot Phra Buddha Issara.
