= Anti-Money Laundering Office (Thailand) =

Government agency of Thailand

Kingdom of Thailand Anti-Money Laundering Office
- สำนักงานป้องกันและปราบปรามการฟอกเงิน
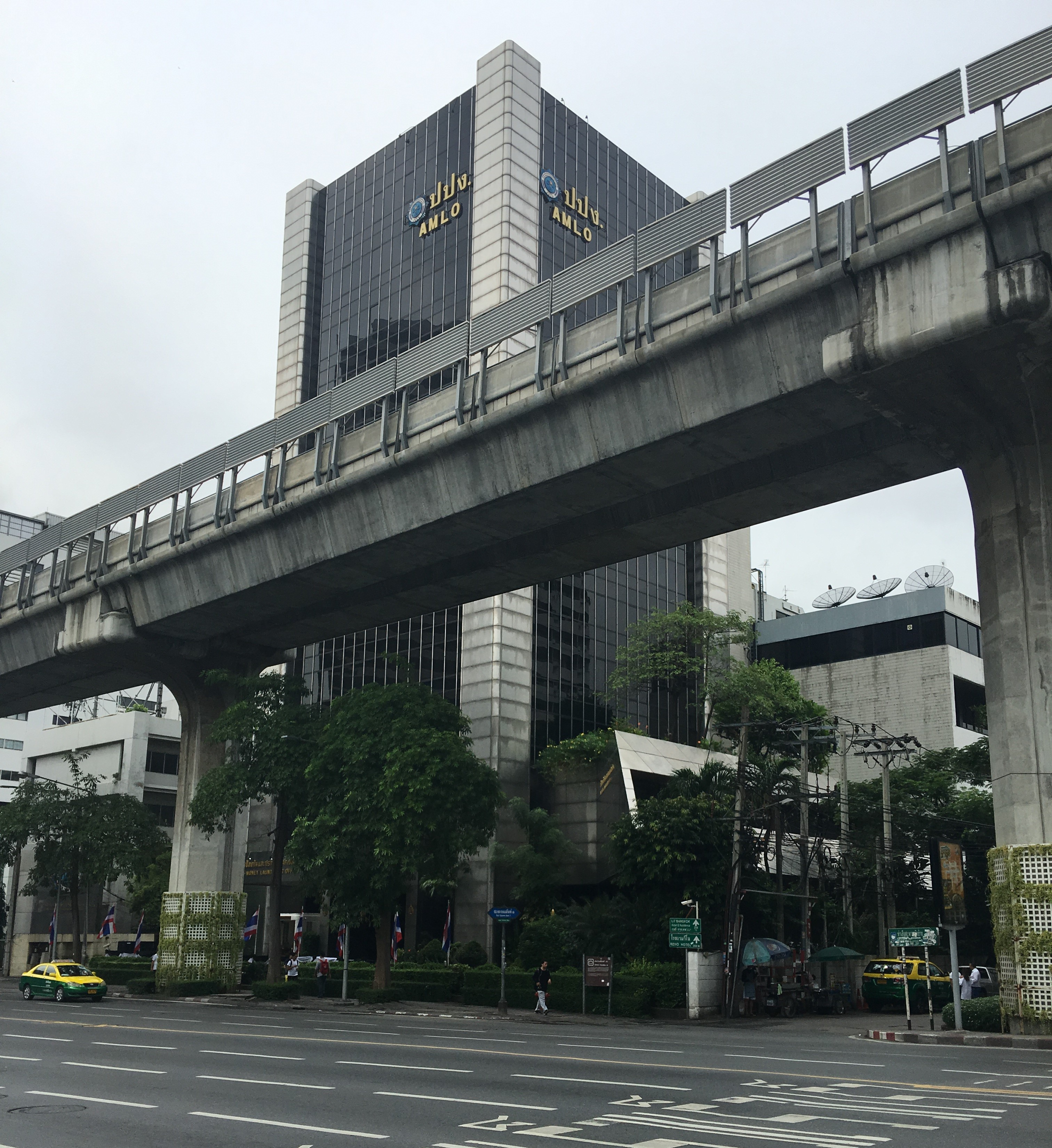
- AMLO headquarters on Phaya Thai Road in 2016

Agency overview
- Formed: 19 August 1999
- Jurisdiction: Kingdom of Thailand
- Headquarters: Pathum Wan, Bangkok, Thailand
- Employees: 399
- Annual budget: 374.1 million baht (FY2017)
- Agency executive: Niwatchai Kasemmongkol, Secretary-General
- Parent Agency: Office of the Prime Minister
- Website: Official website

The Anti-Money Laundering Office (AMLO) is Thailand's "key agency responsible for enforcement of the anti-money laundering and the counterterrorism financing law." It was founded in 1999 upon the adoption of the Anti-Money Laundering Act, B.E. 2542 (1999) (AMLA). AMLO is an independent governmental agency. It has the status of a department functioning independently and neutrally under the supervision of the minister of justice, but is not part of the justice ministry. In 2016, Prime Minister Prayut Chan-o-cha ordered by the cabinet resolution change the command to under the supervision of the Prime Minister directly.

The AMLO 2016 Annual Report reported 369 AMLO positions allocated, with 49 positions vacant, plus 30 government employee positions, with two vacancies. Its budget for FY2017 (1 October 2016 to 30 September 2017) is 374.1 million baht.

As of 30 September 2016, the AMLO had custody of seized and/or frozen assets valued at 6,176,029,774.12 baht. It conducted 12 asset auctions during FY2016, selling 910 items of assets for 57,893,949 baht.

From 29 June to 14 August 2018 AMLO was headed by Secretary-General Police Major General Romsit Viriyasan. He was moved to an "inactive post" in the prime minister's office for failing to expedite politically sensitive cases. Pol Maj Gen Preecha Chareonsahayanon was named acting secretary-general.

== Panama Papers ==
In April 2016, AMLO began investigating Thai nationals whose names surfaced in the Panama Papers.

== See also ==
- National Anti-Corruption Commission
