= Suwit Thongprasert =

Thai activist

- สุวิทย์ ทองประเสริฐ
- Born: January 1, 1956 (age 70); Nakhon Pathom province, Thailand
- Other names: Suwit, Phra Buddha Isara, Luang Pu Buddha Isara, Phra Suwit Dhiradhammo
- Occupations: Former Buddhist monk, activist
- Known for: Leader of PDRC protests during the 2013–2014 Thai political crisis; campaigns to reform Buddhism in Thailand
- Movement: PDRC
- Criminal charges: Treason, leading a criminal organization, extortion, forging royal emblem
- Parent(s): Chompoo and Amporn Thongprasert

Suwit Thongprasert (Thai: สุวิทย์ ทองประเสริฐ), formerly known by the monastic names Phra Buddha Isara (Thai: พระพุทธะอิสระ) and Phra Suwit Dhiradhammo, is a Thai former activist Buddhist monk and former abbot of Wat On Noi, Kamphaeng Saen District, Nakhon Pathom Province. He is known for leading PDRC protests and advocating reforms in Thailand's Buddhist institutions.

== Biography ==
Suwit was born in Bangkok on 1 January 1956 to Chompoo and Amporn Thongprasert. He was first ordained at age 20 at Wat Khlong Toei Nai, Khlong Toei District, later left the monkhood to serve in the military, and re-ordained in Phatthalung Province in 1983 with the monastic title "Dhammathero." He established Wat On Noi on donated land in Huai Khwang Subdistrict, Kamphaeng Saen District, Nakhon Pathom Province in 1989 and became abbot in 1995. He was appointed Chief Monk of Huai Khwang Subdistrict in 1999 after his predecessor passed away.

Suwit resigned from the subdistrict abbot position and was defrocked and re-ordained in October 2001, receiving a new monastic title "Thiradhammo." On 23 May 2016, Suwit submitted a letter to the Department of Special Investigation requesting the seizure of assets belonging to Luang Por Dhammajayo.

== 2013–2014 Thai political crisis ==
During the 2013–2014 Thai political crisis, Suwit joined the PDRC protests to remove the government of Prime Minister Yingluck Shinawatra. He gave Dhamma talks and encouraged protesters at locations including Democracy Monument, the Ministry of Finance, and Chaeng Watthana Government Center.

From 13 January 2014, when PDRC began traffic-blocking protests in multiple Bangkok areas, Suwit led the protesters at the Chaeng Watthana stage, which was farthest from other stages.

On 14 May 2014, the Criminal Court approved arrest warrants for 43 PDRC leaders, including Suwit, for treason and seven other charges.

=== Arrest ===
On 24 May 2018, Suwit was arrested by police commandos at Wat Onoi in Nakhon Pathom Province. He was charged with leading a criminal organization, extortion, and forging the royal emblem of King Vajiralongkorn. He was defrocked and incarcerated after bail was rejected.
