= National Office of Buddhism =

Agency of the central government of Thailand

- สำนักงานพระพุทธศาสนาแห่งชาติ

Agency overview
- Formed: 3 October 2002; 24 years ago
- Jurisdiction: Thailand
- Headquarters: Phutthamonthon, Nakhon Pathom, Thailand
- Agency executive: Ittiporn Chan-iam, Director
- Parent agency: Under Prime Minister of Thailand
- Website: Official website

The National Office of Buddhism (Abrv: NOB; Thai: สำนักงานพระพุทธศาสนาแห่งชาติ, RTGS: samnak-ngan phra phutthasatsana haeng chat) is an agency of the central government of Thailand. It is a ministry-independent department-level government agency, reporting directly to the prime minister. The National Office of Buddhism is responsible for state administration of the religion, including the development of Phuttamonthon as a religious center. Religious affairs are handled by a Sangha Supreme Council of monks.

NOB, together with the Sangha, sponsors Thailand's overseas Buddhist missionary policy and activities.

== History ==
Traditionally, the government of Thailand administered matters of religion and public education together, under the Ministry of Public Institution, whose name was changed to the Ministry of Education in a 1943 reform, which also established the Department of Religious Affairs within the ministry. Another reform in 2002 moved the Department of Religious Affairs to the Ministry of Culture and split part of its responsibilities to create the independent National Office of Buddhism.

== Case of corrupted officials ==
The head of the National Office of Buddhism, Pongporn Pramsaneh, a former policeman who joined the organization in February 2017, vowed to reform Thailand's 37,075 temples by forcing them to open their financial accounts to the public. The temples receive an estimated US$3.5 billion a year in donations. The government provides a further 4.67 billion baht (US$137 million) to support temples and their more than 300,000 monks. In August 2017, Pongporn was dismissed from his position after Buddhist groups called on the government to sack him over his plans to clean up monasteries, but he was reinstated in September 2017. His reinstatement followed a police decision to bring charges against four senior monks in connection with temple funds embezzlement. The alleged wrongdoings have since broadened to include officials of the National Office of Buddhism who are alleged to have worked with senior monks in charge of at least 45 temples in Bangkok and other provinces to embezzle more than 270 million baht in state funding. As of April 2018, at least one Thai Buddhist organization is again calling for Pongporn's ouster, claiming that, "...laymen did not have the power to rule over monks." There are signs, however, of growing opposition to clerical independence. As an editorial in the Bangkok Post put it, "...temple donations must be transparent and open to independent auditing. The government must also make temples stand on their own feet. No more financial support; no more privileges."

A former head of the NOB, Panom Sornsilp, was sentenced to 20 years in prison on 27 December 2019 after being found guilty by the Criminal Court of corruption in connection with temple funds. In May 2020, his sentence was increased to 94 years. Sentenced with him, on similar charges, was Wasawat Kittithirasith, the former director of the Office of Temple Renovation and Development and Religious Welfare. Two others, who served as brokers, approached temples and offered to help them secure funding from the Office of Buddhism for temple renovation in return for a 75% under-the-table commission. They were sentenced to six years and eight months and one year and eight months. The temple fund scam dates from 2017, when the abbot of Wat Takaela in Phetchaburi Province filed a complaint with the Anti-Corruption Police Command seeking an investigation. His temple was allocated 10 million baht by the NOB for renovation, but he was told to return the bulk of the money to the officials who helped to secure the funding. The scam worked by having unofficial brokers, with connections to NOB officials, tell the abbots that they could arrange funding for renovations, but only on the condition that they return three-quarters of the money to the officials and use what remained for renovation. Several temple abbots joined in the scam and pocketed temple funds, spending none on temple renovation.

Thailand's National Anti-Corruption Commission (NACC) in January 2020 requested that the Office of the Attorney-General file charges against Nopparat Benjawattananan and seven other persons with the Criminal Court for Corruption and Misconduct. Nopparat, former head of the NOB, amassed assets worth about 575 million baht during his four-year tenure, a sum the NACC says is not proportionate to his income.

In May 2020, five former NOB officials were convicted of embezzling 21 million baht from the NOB in 2015. Four were sentenced to 13 years in prison, one for four years, and all must repay the stolen funds.
