= Royal Dhamma Studies Office =

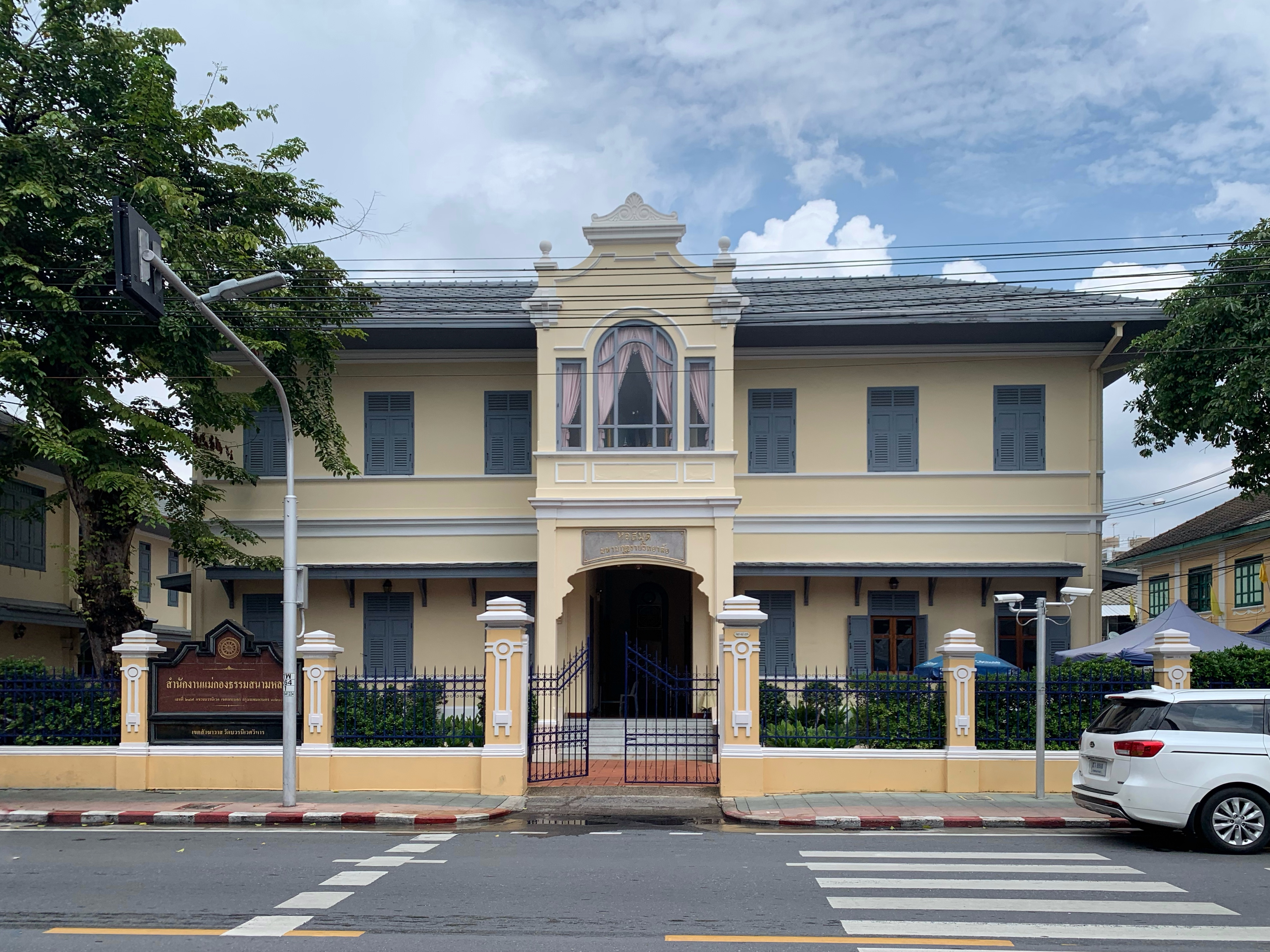
The Royal Dhamma Studies Office at Wat Bowonniwet Vihara

The logo of the Thai Sanam Luang Dhamma Studies Examination Board

The Royal Dhamma Studies Office, also known as the Sanam Luang Dhamma Examination Division operating alongside the Sanam Luang Pali Examination Division of the Thai Sangha and other monastic orders, is an agency under the command of the Supreme Patriarch of Thailand. Its operations are governed by the resolutions and approval of the Sangha Supreme Council (SSC) and the Pariyatti Dhamma Education Committee.

The division is under the patronage of the Thai government. The National Office of Buddhism serves as the committee and secretary to support its work, and it is sustained by an annual government budget allocation. Its primary responsibility is to manage the national teaching and learning of the Nak Tham and Thammasuksa curricula at the Tri, Tho, and Ek levels. Furthermore, it organizes the annual final examinations to assess the Nak Tham and Thammasuksa courses offered throughout the Kingdom of Thailand and abroad.

This agency hosts a three tier system used throughout Thailand for training in theoretical knowledge about Buddhism, that is the Sanam Luang examination. The curriculum is run in tandem with the nine-tiered Pahrian Thamm curriculum for Pali Studies. The curriculum offers two slightly different sets of examination papers

1. Nak Thamm designed for the ordained Sangha i.e. Buddhist monks, novices and nuns
2. Thammaseuksa designed for lay Buddhists.

Tuition for the Nak Thamm and Thammaseuksa curricula and the examinations themselves take place throughout Thailand annually. Thammaseuksa tuition and examinations are also held in some Thai temples outside Thailand.

== Dhamma study ==
The Dhamma Studies examination system was introduced by King Mongkut (Rama IV) during the time he was ordained as a monk Bhikkhu Vajirañāṇo before he succeeded to the throne with the objective that monks could learn about monastic conduct more conveniently by studying translations of it in Thai language rather than Pali. He started writing Nak Thamm texts since the time he became abbot of Wat Bovornives in 1892. The examination system became more widespread as of 1905 because new laws exempted novices from military service if they had nak thamm qualifications. The first centralized examinations were held on 27 March 1911 at Wat Bovornives, Wat Mahathat Yuwaratrangsarit and Wat Benchamabophit. The following year, the curriculum reached its present quad-partite form of Dhamma analysis [dhammavipaaka], life of the Buddha [buddhabravat], essay writing based on Pali proverbs [kae kratoo thamm] and monastic discipline [vinai]. In 1912, three grades of advancement were set in the examinations - elementary [tree] for monks in their first five years of ordination, intermediate [toh] for those who had been monks 5–10 years and advanced [ayk] for monks of ten vassas and over. The nak thamm curriculum was adapted for the laity as thamma seuksa at the behest of the Supreme Patriarch Somdet Phra Luang Jinavorasirivattana from 1929 onwards.

=== Present day ===
Presently Phraphromuni [Chand Phromagutto](Pali Grade 9) of Wat Bowonniwet is the chief examiner for the Sanam Luang Dhamma Studies Examination Curriculum and presides over a national examination board for this curriculum. The board is authorized as an organ of the Thai Sangha Supreme Council and hence the whole monastic community of Thailand. Within Thailand, hundreds of thousands take the examinations annually. Since it is encouraged for the men ordaining for the Buddhist lent take the elementary nak thamm examination before leaving the robe, the elementary nak thamm examinations are generally held in mid-October - the intermediate and advanced nak thamm and all thamma seuksa examinations being held in mid-November.

=== International uptake ===
One initiative of the 19th Supreme Patriarch Somdej Phra Nyanasamvara Suvaddhana was to have many of the thamma seuksa texts and examinations translated into English, bearing in mind the nurture of Thai children growing up outside Thailand. Thamma seuksa examinations are now held in Europe, the northern states of Malaysia, Indonesia, Hong Kong, Australia and the United States of America. The Dhammakaya Movement in the United Kingdom was the first to introduce thamma seuksa examinations to Europe in 2006. The different continents of the world each have a particular time of the year when they organize their thamma seuksa examinations to allow invigilators from Thailand to make the rounds. For Europe the examinations are held in mid-June.

== See also ==
- Pāli Canon
- Pariyatti
- Dhamma Society Fund
- Mahachulalongkornrajavidyalaya University
- Mahamakut Buddhist University
- International Buddhist Studies College
- List of Sāsana Azani recipients
- Tipitakadhara Tipitakakovida Selection Examinations
- Monastic examinations (Myanmar)
- Monastic schools in Myanmar
- Pirivena, monastic colleges in Sri Lanka
