= Muangthai Raisabdah =

Thai TV program

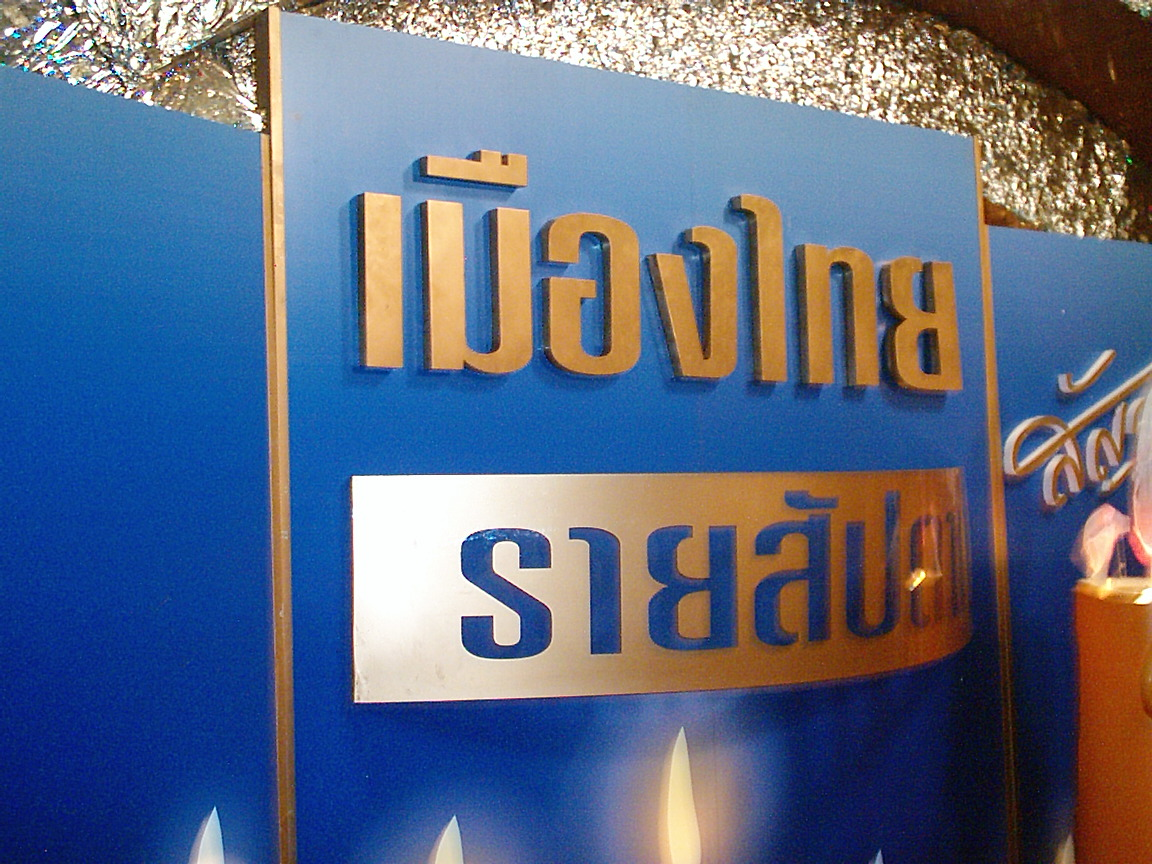
Nameplate of the program while live from Lumphini Park

Muangthai Raisabdah (Thai: เมืองไทยรายสัปดาห์, lit. Thailand Weekly) is a Thai political talk show hosted by Sondhi Limthongkul and Sarocha Pornudomsak. The show is Sondhi's personal mouthpiece, and up to 2004 it praised Premier Thaksin Shinawatra. Later, when relations between the two soured, it became one of the Premier's most vocal critics. In September 2005, the show was cancelled by its broadcaster, MCOT, after Sondhi allegedly made on-air comments disrespectful to King Bhumibol Adulyadej. Sondhi started independently broadcasting his show via satellite and internet, turning tapings into rallies against the government. In February 2006, Sondhi co-founded the People's Alliance for Democracy and the show was incorporated into the PAD's anti-Thaksin rallies.

== Muangthai Raisabdah on MCOT ==
Muangthai Raisabdah was originally broadcast on MCOT Channel 9, a leading Thai broadcaster, and produced by M Group, Sondhi Limthongkul's media company. The news analysis talkshow's hosts were Sondhi Limthongkul and Sarocha Pornudomsak, and the original editorial stance was strongly pro-Thaksin Shinawatra and pro-Thai Rak Thai. In 2002, Democrat Party Alongkorn Pollabutr accused the government of granting favors to M Group shows. On a 23 September 2003 broadcast, Sondhi noted that Thaksin was "the best prime minister our country has ever had."

Muangthai Raisabdah political stance changed in early 2004, after the governor of the Bank of Thailand fired Viroj Nualkhair, CEO of state-owned Krung Thai Bank. Viroj Nualkhair was Sondhi Limthongkul's banker, and had forgiven Sondhi of billions of Baht in debt. Sondhi's public criticism of the Thaksin government increased throughout 2004.

In September 2005, Sondhi reportedly made repeated disrespectful on-air references to King Bhumibol Adulyadej. Among these references was a claim that the government's 2004 appointment of Somdet Phra Buddhacharya as acting Supreme Patriarch in place of the critically ill Somdet Phra Yanasangworn contravened the prerogative of the King. According to Thai ecclesiastic law, the Supreme Patriarch is nominated by the Sangha Supreme Council and formally appointed by the King. Somdet Phra Phuthacharn's appointment was vehemently opposed by Luang Ta Maha Bua, an influential monk with close affiliations to Sondhi (see Luang Ta Maha Bua's opposition to Thaksin Shinawatra). After discussions with King's principal private secretary, Arsa Sarasin, MCOT executives cancelled the program.

== Muangthai Raisabdah on the Road ==
=== References to the King ===
Sondhi took his talkshow on the road, broadcasting via satellite (through his ASTV channel based out of Hong Kong) and webcasting via the website of his Manager Daily newspaper. The show, which was taped at locations like the M Group corporate headquarters, the auditorium of Thammasat University, Wat Pa Ban Tat in Udon Thani (Luang Ta Maha Bua's temple), and Lumphini Park, attracted large crowds and turned into political rallies. Sondhi, responding to early allegations that he had disrespected the King, took to wearing yellow (the royal color) and using the slogan "We will fight for the King" and "Return power to the King."

The constant references to the King caused Generals Prem Tinsulanonda and Surayud Chulanont, members of the King's Privy Council, to warn the public to keep the King out of politics. However, "We will fight the King" remained Muangthai Raisabdah's slogan.

=== Accusations ===
During this period, Sondhi made several controversial comments on Muangthai Raisabdah, including the claim that a team of assassins was following him around, the claim that the Thai Rak Thai party was affiliated to the Chinese Communist Party, the claim that there was corruption in the Thai Air Force's purchase of Russian-made SU-30 MK jet fighters, and the claim (repeated from a 1997 government censor debate) that Thaksin profited from insider information during the 1997 devaluation of the Baht.

=== Popularity ===
The 9th episode on 19 November 2005, dealing with the royal prerogatives of the King and held at Lumphini Park, was particularly popular, with Manager newspaper reporting that 100,000 people in attendance. This episode formally introduced the slogan "Return power to the King." At the conclusion of the show, Sondhi announced that he would be moving the venue of the protests cum television shows to the royal cremation grounds at Sanam Luang.

By February, Sondhi's campaign was wildly successful, with visits to the news website of the M Group tripling compared to the beginning of the campaign. The 4 February 2006 episode, broadcast in front of the King Rama V equestrian statue in front of the former Parliament, consisted of a seminar attended by former M Group employees like Anchalee Paireerak, Yuthiyong Limlertwatee, Pantep Puapongpant, Kumnoon Sidhisaman and Sumran Rodpetch. Former leader of the Palang Dharma Party Chamlong Srimuang and Senator Jermsak Pinthong were also in attendance. That evening, protestors sent petitioned Privy Council President Prem Tinsulanonda and King Bhunmibol Adulyadej demanding the resignation of Thaksin Shinawatra. Although organizers expected some 100,000 people, only approximately 40,000 appeared.

On 24 February 2006, Thaksin dissolved Parliament, after only a year after being elected back into power, and announced House elections for 2 April. The opposition Democrat, Chart Thai and Mahachon parties announced a boycott of the election on 27 February. For details on the election, see April 2006 Thailand legislative election.

== Muangthai Raisabdah Political Concert ==
Following Sondhi Limthongkul's establishment of the People's Alliance for Democracy in February 2006, Muangthai Raisabdah was incorporated into the PAD's political rallies. For a full list of PAD rallies, see PAD protests against Thaksin Shinawatra.

== After the coup ==
A military coup overthrew the government of Thaksin Shinawatra on 19 September 2006. The military junta that seized power ordered state-television broadcaster MCOT to cover weekly tapings of Muangthai Raisabdah.

== See also ==
- Thailand political crisis 2005-2006
- Sondhi Limthongkul
- Thaksin Shinawatra
- People's Alliance for Democracy
- PAD protests against Thaksin Shinawatra
