= Dhammakaya =

Dhammakāya is a Pāli term which means "body of dharma", "body of truth" or the "body of enlightenment". Its Sanskrit equivalent is Dharmakāya. It can refer to:

- Dhammakāya, in Theravāda Buddhism, a figurative term meaning the sum of the Buddha's teachings
- Dhammakaya Tradition, Thai Buddhist tradition, mostly known through Wat Phra Dhammakaya
- Dhammakaya Tradition UK, specific lineage of Thai Buddhism in Britain
- Dhammakaya meditation, a Buddhist meditation technique
- Dhammakaya Media Channel, former name of Global Buddhist Network, Buddhist television channel owned by Wat Phra Dhammakaya
