= Somdet Kiaw =

Abbot of Wat Saket and acting Supreme Patriarch of Thailand

- สมเด็จเกี่ยว
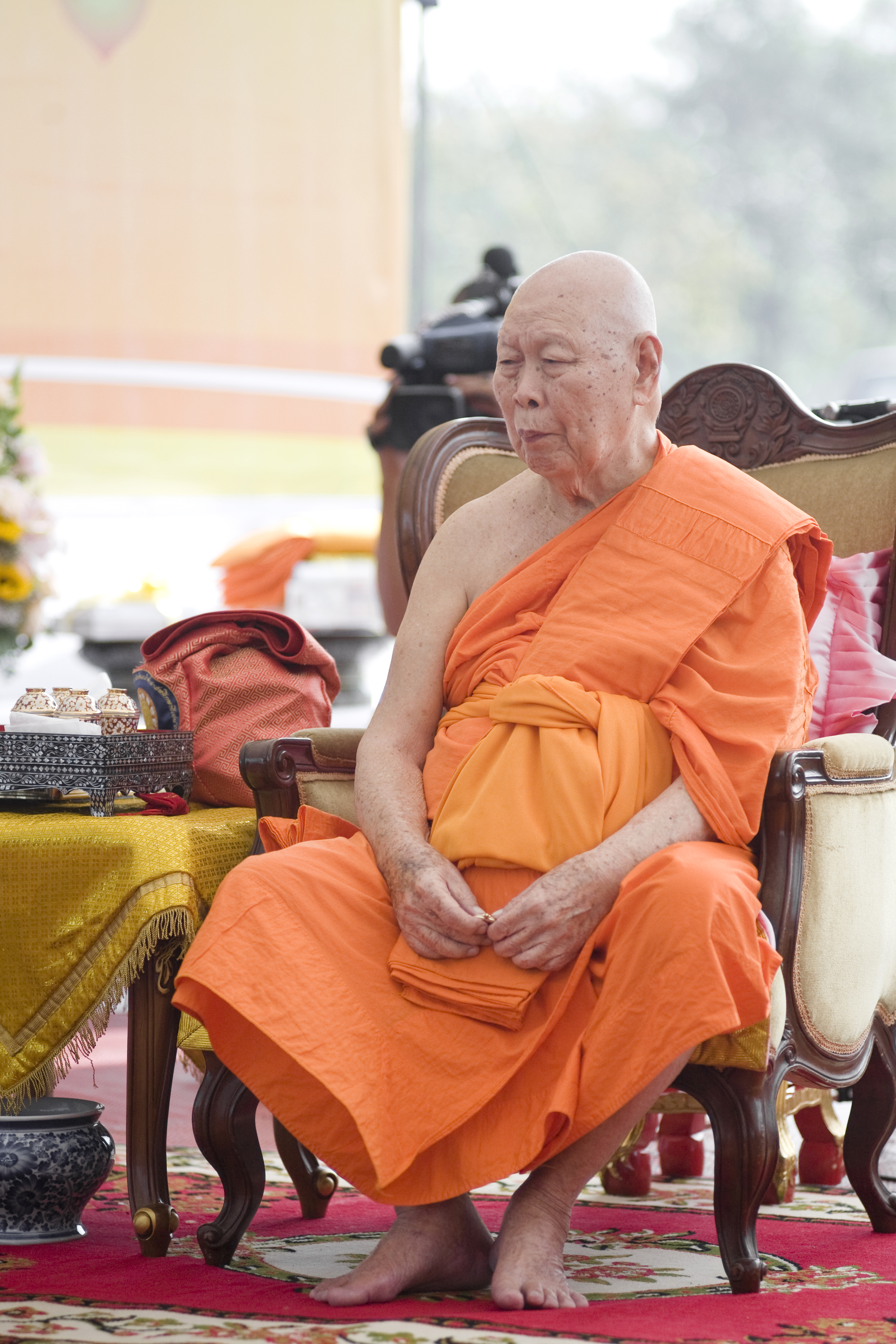

Personal life
- Born: Kiaw Chokchai; 3 March 1929 Koh Samui, Surat Thani, Siam
- Died: 10 August 2013 (aged 84) Bangkok, Thailand

Religious life
- Religion: Buddhism
- Temple: Wat Saket
- Order: Mahā Nikāya
- School: Theravāda
- Dharma names: Upaseṇo
- Monastic name: Somdet Phra Buḍhācārya

Somdet Kiaw (3 March 1929 – 10 August 2013) was a Thai Buddhist monk who served as the abbot of Wat Saket and the acting Supreme Patriarch of Thailand.

== Name ==
Somdet Kiaw (Thai: สมเด็จเกี่ยว; RTGS: Somdet Kiao) was born Kiaw Chokchai (Thai: เกี่ยว โชคชัย). His Dhamma name, in the Pali language, was Upaseṇo (Thai: อุปเสโณ), and his highest monastic title was Somdet Phra Buḍhācārya (Thai: สมเด็จพระพุฒาจารย์; RTGS: Somdet Phra Phuthachan). His previous monastic titles were as follows:

- Phra Medhisuddhibongsa (Thai: พระเมธีสุทธิพงศ์), 1958
- Phra Rajavisuddhimedhi (Thai: พระราชวิสุทธิเมธี), 1962
- Phra Debgunabhorn (Thai: พระเทพคุณาภรณ์), 1964
- Phra Dharmagunabhorn (Thai: พระธรรมคุณาภรณ์), 1971
- Phra Brahmagunabhorn (Thai: พระพรหมคุณาภรณ์), 1973

== Acting Supreme Patriarch ==
Somdet Kiaw was appointed acting Supreme Patriarch in 2005 due to the failing health of the incumbent Supreme Patriarch Nyanasamvara Suvaddhana. He was a monk of the Mahanikaya order, and was of Thai Chinese descent. His appointment provoked severe criticism from Luang Ta Maha Bua (of the Dhammayuttika Nikaya order) and Sondhi Limthongkul, who claimed that the appointment created two Supreme Patriarchs and contravened the royal prerogative of King Bhumibol Adulyadej. On 4 March 2005, Maha Bua even petitioned King Bhumibol Adulyadej to remove all of Kiaw's royal titles.
