= Phutthachan =

Thai Buddhist ecclesiastical title

Phuthachan (Thai: พุฒาจารย์, Buḍhācārya, lit. 'Senior Master'), formerly Phutthachan (Thai: พุทธาจารย์, Buddhācārya, lit. 'Awakened Master'), is an ecclesiastical title given to senior members of the Thai sangha, the community of Buddhist monks in Thailand.

== History ==
In the Ayutthaya Kingdom, the title Buddhācārya was preserved for Buddhist monks who were patriarchs of the sect of araṇyavāsī (Thai: อรัญวาสี; RTGS: aranyawasi; lit. 'forest dwellers').

In 2394 BE (1851/52 CE), the title Buddhācārya was modified to Buḍhācārya by King Rama IV, who gave it to Son (Thai: สน), the abbot of Wat Saket.

== Title holders ==
Holders of this title include:

- Somdej Toh (17 April 1788 – 22 June 1872)
- Somdet Kiaw (3 March 1928 – 10 August 2013)
