= Sarocha Pornudomsak =

Thai journalist

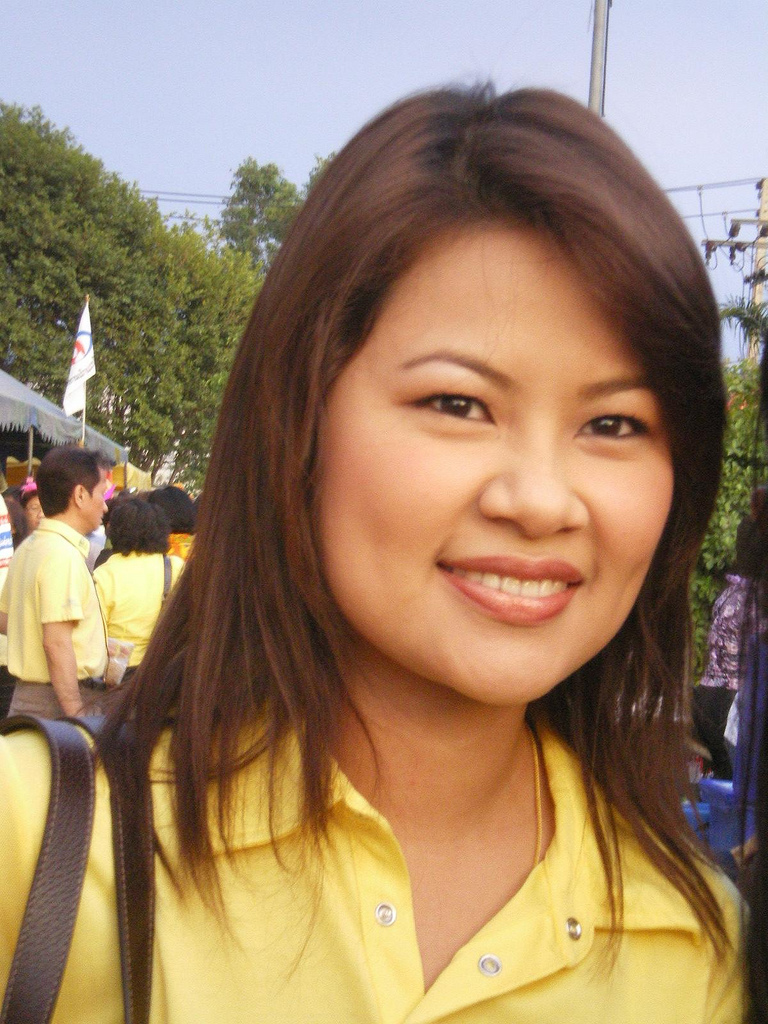
Image of Sarocha Pornudomsak

Sarosha Pornudomsak (Thai: สโรชา พรอุดมศักดิ์), born 11 November 1976 in Bangkok, is a freelance broadcast journalist who is fluent in Thai and English and knowledgeable in international news.

She is best known as co-host of the show Muangthai Raisabdah with Sondhi Limthongkul from 2003 to 2006. The program was instrumental in sparking a series of protests demanding Prime Minister Thaksin Shinawatra resign from the premiership.

In 2007 she returned to Thai broadcast TV with Sondhi Limthongkul for Yam Fao Paendin, a pro-government, anti-Thaksin program on Thai government channel 11. The show was taken off the air after two weeks because of criticism that the government was using it as propaganda while at the same time preventing anti-government PTV from broadcasting.

Pornudomsak graduated with a Bachelor of Journalism from Arizona State University in 1997. She served as English editor and anchor for the Nation Channel in Thailand from 1999 to 2002 and as Indo-China correspondent for Channel News Asia in Singapore from 2002 to 2004. She was network director of Thailand Outlook Channel (TOC), an English news channel that was part of the Manager Media Group from 2004 to 2011 before her team set up In Channel, an English language channel broadcasting on cable network True Visions. She went on to become program director for digital channel PPTV and left to pursue a career as a freelance broadcast journalist. She has done international news commentary on NOW and New TV.

She also voices the announcements on the MRT (Metropolitan Rapid Transit) lines operated by Bangkok Expressway and Metro; Blue Line and Purple Line.
