= Mahapanya Vidayalai =

Buddhist school in Thailand

Coordinates: 7°00′16.56″N 100°29′25.97″E

- มหาปัญญาวิทยาลัย
- Type: Private college
- Established: 2002
- President: Phra Arjan Ongpotchanagornkosol
- Administrative staff: Khenpo Phuntsho Gyaltshen (Director 2016-), Khenpo Chonyi Rangdrol (Head of Buddhist Studies 2007-), Ven. Maha Suchat (Pali lecturer), Asst. Prof. Dr. Premin Karawe (linguistics), Ven. Phurba Tshering Sherpa (Registrar 2016-), Bhikku Aphiwit Mahachatree (Assistant Registrar), Arjan Sawadee Bumjawat (Head of administration 2002-), Miss Nuntana Bumpen (Learning service)
- Location: Hat Yai, Thailand
- Campus: Hatyai
- Website: www.mahapanya.ac.th

Mahapanya Vidayalai (Thai: มหาปัญญาวิทยาลัย), translated roughly as a college of wisdom, is an international Buddhist school located in Hat Yai, Songkhla Province, Thailand. The college is affiliated with Mahachulalongkornrajavidyalaya University.

Founded by Oou Joo Heng, Supreme Patriarch of Anamikaya (the Vietnamese Mahayana Buddhist sect of Thailand) and with support of the Theravada Sangha, the school was launched in 2002. It offers high school education as well as an international bachelor's degree program in Buddhist studies with a concentration in Mahayana Buddhism.
