= Sanam Luang examination =

The Sanam Luang examination (Thai: สอบสนามหลวง) is an examination assessing the knowledge of Pariyatti Dhamma (Buddhist teachings) of the Thai Sangha. The term "Sanam Luang" (Royal Ground/Court) is presumed to derive from the phrase "the Pali Pariyatti Dhamma examination in the Grand Palace". Historically, the Sanam Luang examination was taken under the royal patronage of the Thai monarch, who sponsored the exams within the Grand Palace.

The examinations were originally conducted orally. Bhikkhus (monks) or samaneras (novices) who had sufficiently studied Pali would take the Sanam Luang Pali examination by translating Pali scriptures into Thai, or translating Thai into Pali, in front of the royal throne and a committee of senior monks. Those who passed the various levels (Prayok) would be granted royal titles (Samanasak), fans of rank (Phayat), and a set of three robes (Trai Chiwan). As a mark of honor, the King would graciously appoint the passing monks and novices as Parian (Pali scholars) and provide them with a royal stipend (Nitayaphat).

== History ==
The Sanam Luang Pali examination has existed since the Ayutthaya Kingdom period. During the early Rattanakosin period, the King graciously commanded that the exams be held in the same manner as during the Ayutthaya period, which was once every three years. It was an oral examination with highly knowledgeable senior monks acting as examiners.

=== Oral examinations in the past ===
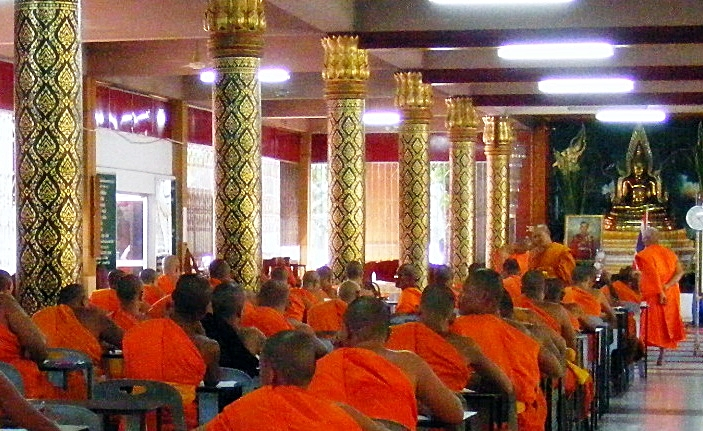
Today, the Sanam Luang examination has transitioned from an oral format in front of the throne to a written format, with examination centers distributed throughout all regions of the country.

The examination method in the past required the candidate to translate the Atthakatha (commentaries) in front of senior monks, who would actively question and interrogate the candidate. This led to the terms Lai Khwam Ru (testing knowledge) or Sop Lai (final examination).

The subjects tested for each Prayok (level) were based on various Suttas, ranging from Prayok 1 up to Prayok 9. Candidates had to pass the exams sequentially. If a candidate passed Prayok 1 and 2 but failed Prayok 3, they had to start over from Prayok 1. However, once a candidate successfully passed Prayok 3, they could then take subsequent exams either one level or multiple levels at a time.

From the early Rattanakosin period up until the change of government in 1932, all monks were required to study for and take the Sanam Luang Pali examinations. If any monk passed and became a Parian of level 3 or higher, and was awarded an ecclesiastical title of Phra Khru or above, they could cease taking the Sanam Luang Pali exams, though they could voluntarily continue. Monks who had not yet received a royal title had to keep taking the exams until they completed Parian 9.

=== Transition to written examinations ===
When King Rama V graciously established Mahamakut Rajavidyalaya within the Dhammayuttika Nikaya order, Somdet Phra Maha Samana Chao Krom Phraya Vajirañāṇavarorasa—who was then the assistant head of the Dhammayuttika Nikaya—designed its curriculum. This curriculum required students to study both Thai texts and Pali grammar. The students at Mahamakut Rajavidyalaya included monks, novices, and laypeople.

Consequently, the Sanam Luang Pali examination during that era was split into two tracks: the traditional oral examination track, and the track for those studying the Mahamakut Rajavidyalaya curriculum, which utilized a written exam format. The written track was divided into three levels: Parian Tri (equivalent to the old Parian 4), Parian Tho (equivalent to the old Parian 5), and Parian Ek (equivalent to the old Parian 7).

Examinations under the Mahamakut Rajavidyalaya curriculum continued until the early reign of King Rama VI. The entire Sanam Luang Pali examination curriculum was then revamped using the Mahamakut Rajavidyalaya curriculum as its foundation. The Parian Tri, Tho, and Ek levels were abolished, reverting to the Prayok 1 to 9 levels used today.

== Current Sanam Luang examinations ==
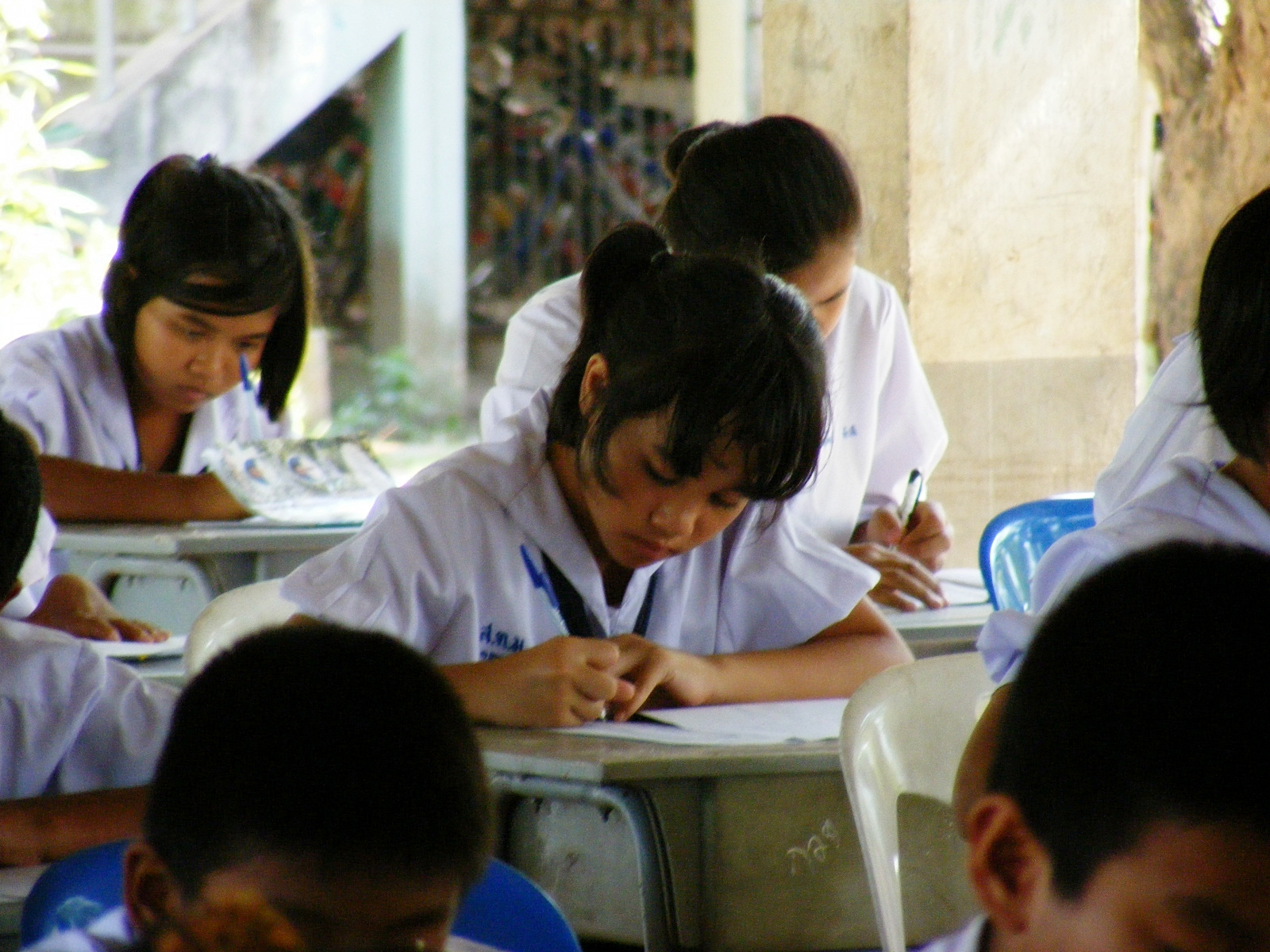
Currently, laypeople can also take the Sanam Luang examinations, but only under the Thammasuksa curriculum, which is notably less intensive than the Dhamma studies required for monks.

The current Sanam Luang examinations are divided into two distinct categories: the Sanam Luang Pali examination and the Sanam Luang Dhamma examination.

Today, taking the Sanam Luang Pali examination at the Parian Tri level (Prayok 1–2 to 3) and the first level of Parian Tho (Prayok 4) is much more convenient than in the past. Candidates no longer have to travel to the central testing location; instead, there is one examination center per province nationwide, with Bangkok and its surrounding provinces serving as the central hub.

=== Current Sanam Luang Pali examinations ===
The Pali Pariyatti Dhamma examination, or the Sanam Luang Pali examination, is divided into 9 levels (Prayok):

- Prayok 1–2 to Prayok 3 form Parian Tri (The Ministry of Education recognizes this as equivalent to a junior high school diploma).
- Prayok 4 to Prayok 6 form Parian Tho (Equivalent to a senior high school diploma).
- Prayok 7 to Prayok 9 form Parian Ek (Equivalent to a bachelor's degree).

The Sanam Luang Pali examinations are currently held twice a year. The first round is for Prayok 6 to Prayok 9, and the second round is for Prayok 1–2 to Prayok 5. Both rounds are held simultaneously nationwide using standardized exam papers issued by the Sanam Luang Pali Examination Division.

1st Round
Coincides with the 2nd and 3rd waxing moon days of the 3rd lunar month for Parian Dhamma 6-7, and the 4th, 5th, and 6th waxing moon days of the 3rd lunar month for Parian Dhamma 8-9.
2nd Round
Coincides with the 10th, 11th, and 12th waning moon days of the 3rd lunar month for Prayok 1-2 through Parian Dhamma 5.

=== Current Sanam Luang Dhamma examinations ===
The Dhamma Pariyatti Dhamma examination, or the Sanam Luang Dhamma examination, is divided into 2 categories: the Nak Tham (Dhamma Scholar) examination for monks and novices, and the Thammasuksa (Dhamma Studies) examination for laypeople.

==== Levels of study ====
The studies are divided into 3 levels:

Nak Tham Tri, Nak Tham Tho, Nak Tham Ek
For monks and novices (Those who pass Nak Tham Ek are recognized by the Ministry of Education as having an education equivalent to upper elementary school).
Thammasuksa Tri, Thammasuksa Tho, Thammasuksa Ek
For laypeople.

==== Examination scheduling ====
The Sanam Luang Dhamma examinations are held twice a year.

1st Round
Coincides with the 9th to 12th waxing moon days of the 11th lunar month. This round is for the Nak Tham Tri examination for monks and novices.
2nd Round
Coincides with the 2nd to 5th waning moon days of the 12th lunar month. This round is for the Nak Tham Tho and Ek examinations for monks and novices.

For Thammasuksa, the examination is held on a single day: the 5th waning moon day of the 12th lunar month.

In the 2008 academic year, a total of 1,833,874 laypeople took the Thammasuksa examinations at the Tri, Tho, and Ek levels.

== See also ==
- Monastic examinations
