= Dhammakaya Tradition UK =

Dhammakaya International Society of the UK
- Known locally as "Dhammakaya London"

Religion
- Affiliation: Theravāda Buddhism, Dhammakaya

Location
- Location: 2 Brushfield Way, Knaphill, Woking, Surrey, GU21 2TG
- Country: United Kingdom

Architecture
- Founder: Wat Phra Dhammakaya, Thailand
- Completed: 2005

Website
- dhammakaya.london

The Dhammakaya Tradition is one distinctive tradition of Thai Buddhism that has had a pioneering role in establishing Buddhist practice in England since 1954.

== Origins ==
Kapilavaḍḍho Bhikkhu visits Christmas Humphreys at the Buddhist Society 30th Anniversary celebration, 1955

The Dhammakaya Tradition has been known as a specific lineage of Thai Buddhism in Britain since Ţhitavedo visited in October 1953. His protégé William Purfurst (a.k.a. Kapilavaḍḍho Bhikkhu, Richard Randall, 1906–71) travelled to Thailand with Ṭhitavedo as a novice in March 1954 and took higher ordination at Wat Paknam Bhasicharoen, the first European to ordain in Thailand. As the result of subsequent training with Luang Pu Sodh Candasaro, he said to have attained the Dhammakaya and returning to England on 12 November 1954, visiting London and Manchester and founding the English Sangha Trust in July 1955. Three disciples travelled with Kapilavaḍḍho to Thailand on 30 December 1955 and took higher ordination at Wat Paknam on 27 January 1956. These ordinands were Peter Morgan (a.k.a. Paññavaḍḍho Bhikkhu), Robert Albison (a.k.a. Saddhāvaḍḍho Bhikkhu) and George Blake (a.k.a. Vijjāvaḍḍho Bhikkhu). After some time, all four bhikkhus moved to Wat That Thong, Sukhumvit Road, from which time onwards Kapilavaḍḍho and all his subsequent disciples appear to have practised a more eclectic form of Buddhism. Ananda Bodhi (a.k.a. Leslie Dawson, Namgyal Rinpoche), who may have met Paññavaḍḍho in the period 1956–61, went to Wat Paknam for training in the period 1963–4 and returned to England to teach the Dhammakaya method in April 1964 at Biddulph Old Hall, but by August 1964 had changed to teach Burmese Insight meditation. Remnants of Dhammakaya teaching were perpetuated by Acharn Kaew Potikanok's (1926–86) student Fuengsin (née Sarayutpitak) Trafford (1936–95) who practised Dhammakaya meditation until her death. She claims to have fulfilled a prophecy Kaew Potikanok made 15 years earlier that she would spread Buddhism in England, having taught meditation from c.1975 at Birmingham Buddhist Vihara to children on Sundays and English adults each Monday. She also edited the newsletter Children & Dharma for that temple. She taught Buddhism and meditation in various mainstream schools, colleges, universities and prisons. In 1984, Sister Dr. Mary Hall (1928–2008) invited her to teach Buddhism in the Multi-Faith Centre, Harborne Hall, Birmingham and to graduate groups. She was for a time a Buddhist Prison Chaplain from 1986. She also taught as part of Religious Education in schools such as King Edward VI College, Stourbridge, under the direction of Alan Keightley.

== 1980s and 1990s ==
A second phase of the spread of the Dhammakaya tradition in the UK started in the wake of the Thai migration phenomenon – one monk from Wat Phra Dhammakaya, Pathum Thani being sent to study for a bachelor's degree at University of Oxford in 1986 and attracting a succession of English people to visit Wat Phra Dhammakaya in Thailand in the period 1987–1991. Phra Maha Wirat Manikanto completed an MA in Buddhist Studies at the University of Bristol in 1997 and during his stay built up a group of Thai supporters mostly from London and Cheltenham who started to organize the first Sunday of the month celebrations from 1998. These were initially at a house in Bristol in 1997. From 21 April 1999 a small house was rented in Wimbledon (within earshot of Wat Buddhapadipa), with Phra Maha Wirat as abbot and Phra Jirasak Caranasampanno, two laymen, Anuchit Treerattanajutawat and Phibul Choompolpaisal supporting the monks while studying for master's degrees in London universities and for a short time a laywoman Sriwan. The tradition registered as a non-profit organization “the Dhammakaya International Society of the United Kingdom” or ‘DISUK’ on 16 April 2002. Later in the same year, in keeping with Dhammakaya Foundation's policy of rotating personnel, Phra Asadang Siripuñño took over as abbot, moving the temple to a much larger rented premises in Norbury on 7 July 2002. The temple was named Wat Charoenbhavana London. A new abbot, Phrakru Sangharak Wairot Virojano and Phra Thammasarn Cittabhārano took over the running of the temple for the Buddhist lent of 2003. DISUK was granted charitable status on 26 May 2004. At the same time the search continued for a permanent premises for the London temple.

== Establishment of the Manchester Branch ==
In the meanwhile, a second support group in Manchester requested Wat Phra Dhammakaya in Thailand to set up a temple on 18 December 2003. Phra Asadang and Upasaka Anuchit moved north as the pioneering team, with Phra Wut Suvuddhiko succeeding as abbot in 2004. The temple found its first location in rented accommodation at a large former curtain-rail factory at Cheltenham Street, Salford. Phra Praphit Brahmasubho succeeded as abbot in 200?. Various uncanny events surrounded the establishment of Wat Charoenbhavana Manchester including the finding of a 2-metre tall Buddha Image at the side of a road in Wales – which was salvaged as the temples’ first Buddha image. In 2008 the temple moved to a permanent premises in Edgeley and was renamed 'Wat Phra Dhammakaya (Manchester)' or the 'North-West Centre for Buddhist Meditation' - being granted status as a place of worship in 2009. Phra Maha Sairung Thirarojano has been abbot of the new premises from 2009 to present.

== Establishment of the London Branch ==
The London temple negotiated the purchase of the old Brookwood Hospital Chapel at Knaphill in 2004 – a building which had previously been derelict for six years at the time of purchase. The first incumbent was Phra Kru Sangarak Wairot Vairochano who used his considerable construction experience and the architectural designs of Phra Pichit Thitachayo to convert and refurbish the building into a functioning Buddhist centre in 2005. The centre was brought up to UK safety requirements and officially opened by Woking's Mayor Cllr. Bryan Cross on 28 October 2007. Wat Charoenbhavana London officially changed its name to Wat Phra Dhammakaya London in 200?.

== Establishment of other branches ==
A centre has also been established in Newcastle upon Tyne, in the derelict Saint Andrews Church. The church is a Grade II listed building which was built in 1872 by shipbuilding magnate Andrew Leslie of the Hawthorn Leslie shipyard. Preparing the centre required a huge refurbishment. As of 2015, the refurbishment was in progress, and attempts were made to try to maintain the heritage. The centre has activities for both Thai immigrants and English local inhabitants. The centre also holds traditional ceremonies open to the public, which are sometimes joined by the local mayor and mayoress. The center also organizes teachings in the local area, such as the Beacon Museum. As of 2015, the center was run by Phra Samuh Phichit Thitachayao.

In 2016, another centre was founded in Helensburgh, Scotland. As of 2016, the centre was run by Phramaha Amaro, and holds meditation classes regularly.

== Present day ==
The Dhammakaya temples in the UK are the hubs of a network of Dhammakaya practitioners extending from Scotland to the West country. As with many Asian-rooted Buddhist centres in the west, two distinct interest groups frequent the Dhammakaya temples. The first group is predominantly Thai expatriates with a congregation up to 300 strong in Manchester and 400 strong in London and a mailing list of previous visitors reaching the thousands. The second group is the English-speaking (convert) group of practitioners which in London is up to fifty strong with a mailing list of up to 400 previous visitors. Other groups regularly visiting the temple are Buddhist families from the expatriate Singhalese, Bangladeshi and Nepalese communities.

Ten years on, the Dhammakaya practice community of the UK has established a network of local support groups presently in Doncaster, Sheffield, Scotland and Cyprus for the Manchester temple. Brighton, Worthing, Cheltenham, Kent, Swindon and Ireland have monthly groups served by the London temple – and monks are sent regularly to support English language meditation activities in Zurich, Geneva and Ireland. The temples have also been involved with policy-making concerning Buddhism in the UK with participation in TBSUK, NBO, Greenwich Standing Advisory Council on Religious Education, chaplaincy, the SE Buddhist Forum and in 2006 was the first temple to introduce Sanam Luang Dhamma Studies in Europe.
