= International Buddhist Studies College =

International Buddhist Studies College (IBSC)
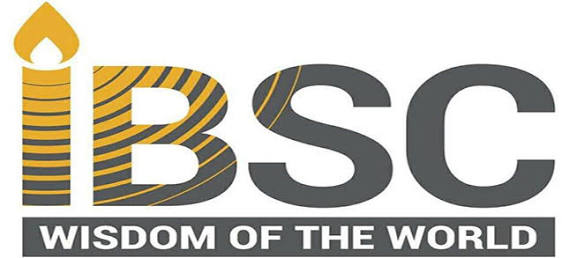
- Motto: Wisdom for the World
- Type: Public
- Established: 2015; 11 years ago
- Affiliation: Buddhist
- Director: Ven.Prof.Dr.Phramaha Hansa Dhammahaso
- Location: Ayutthaya , Thailand
- Website: http://www.ibsc.mcu.ac.th

International Buddhist Studies College (IBSC) is a graduate college of Mahachulalongkornrajavidyalaya University in Wang Noi District, Phra Nakhon Si Ayutthaya Province, Thailand. IBSC was established in order that students from all over the world, who are interested in Buddhism, will be provided with an opportunity to pursue research in Buddhist studies.

IBSC offers international programs in Buddhist Studies, Mindfulness and Meditation, and Peace Studies. All international programs use English language as a medium, including documents, textbooks, and general books. Admission is open for ascetics and laypeople under the same conditions.

IBSC is an inter-sectarian college, where the curriculum program includes subjects on three major Buddhist traditions: Theravada, Mahayana, and Vajrayana. Visiting professors are invited on a regular basis under the Global Academic Platform (GAP) project. Field trips are organized as a part of program for students to gain knowledge of Thai Buddhist culture.

The International Buddhist Studies College (IBSC) is a member of the International Association of Buddhist Universities (IABU) which hosts the annual United Nations Day of Vesak Celebration. IABU is a global forum of Buddhist Universities including in part: Buddhist Academy of China, Vietnam Buddhist University, Dhamma Gate Buddhist College, Jagiellonian University, Tango Buddhist University and Naropa University.

== Buddhist Studies Programs ==
The college offers Bachelor of Arts, Master of Arts, and Doctoral programs in Buddhist Studies conducted in English language. The programs are focused on studying Pali language and Pali literature although main schools of Theravada, Mahayana, and Vajrayana Buddhism are also studied within the curriculum. The programs combine rigorous academic study with meditation practice to offer an integrated education in Buddhist Studies, and are designed for students seeking an in-depth and critical understanding of Buddhist thought in the context of both traditional and academic scholarship.

== Mindfulness and Meditation Programs ==
Master of Arts and Doctoral programs in Mindfulness and Meditation started in 2018 to provide sufficient theoretical knowledge of Theravada Buddhism combined with a deep understanding of mindfulness and meditation techniques and their application to improve personal and social well-being.

== Peace Studies Programs ==
IBSC offers Master of Arts and Doctoral programs in Peace Studies conducted in English or Thai language. The Peace Studies Program encourages students to explore the multiple meanings of peace, the relationship between peace and conflict, and the role of peace on local and global levels. The program provides students the opportunity to examine peace in its philosophical and religious dimensions, particularly from the Buddhist perspective.

== See also ==
- List of Buddhist universities across the world
