= Mahachulalongkornrajavidyalaya University =

Public Buddhist university in Thailand

Coordinates: 13°45′18″N 100°29′24″E

- มหาวิทยาลัยมหาจุฬาลงกรณราชวิทยาลัย
- Motto: Thai: ปญฺญา โลกสฺมิ ปชฺโชโต
- Motto in English: Wisdom is the torch of the world
- Type: Buddhist autonomous public university
- Established: 1887
- Location: Thailand
- Campus: Various, mainly in Wang Noi, Ayutthaya and Bangkok
- Colours: Pink
- Website: www.mcu.ac.th

Mahachulalongkornrajavidyalaya University (MCU) (Thai: มหาวิทยาลัยมหาจุฬาลงกรณราชวิทยาลัย, RTGS: Maha Chulalongkon Ratchawitthayalai) is one of two public Buddhist universities in Thailand, as well as being the oldest Buddhist university in the nation. It has facilities at Wat Mahathat Yuwaratrangsarit in Bangkok and at Wang Noi in Ayutthaya Province.

== History ==
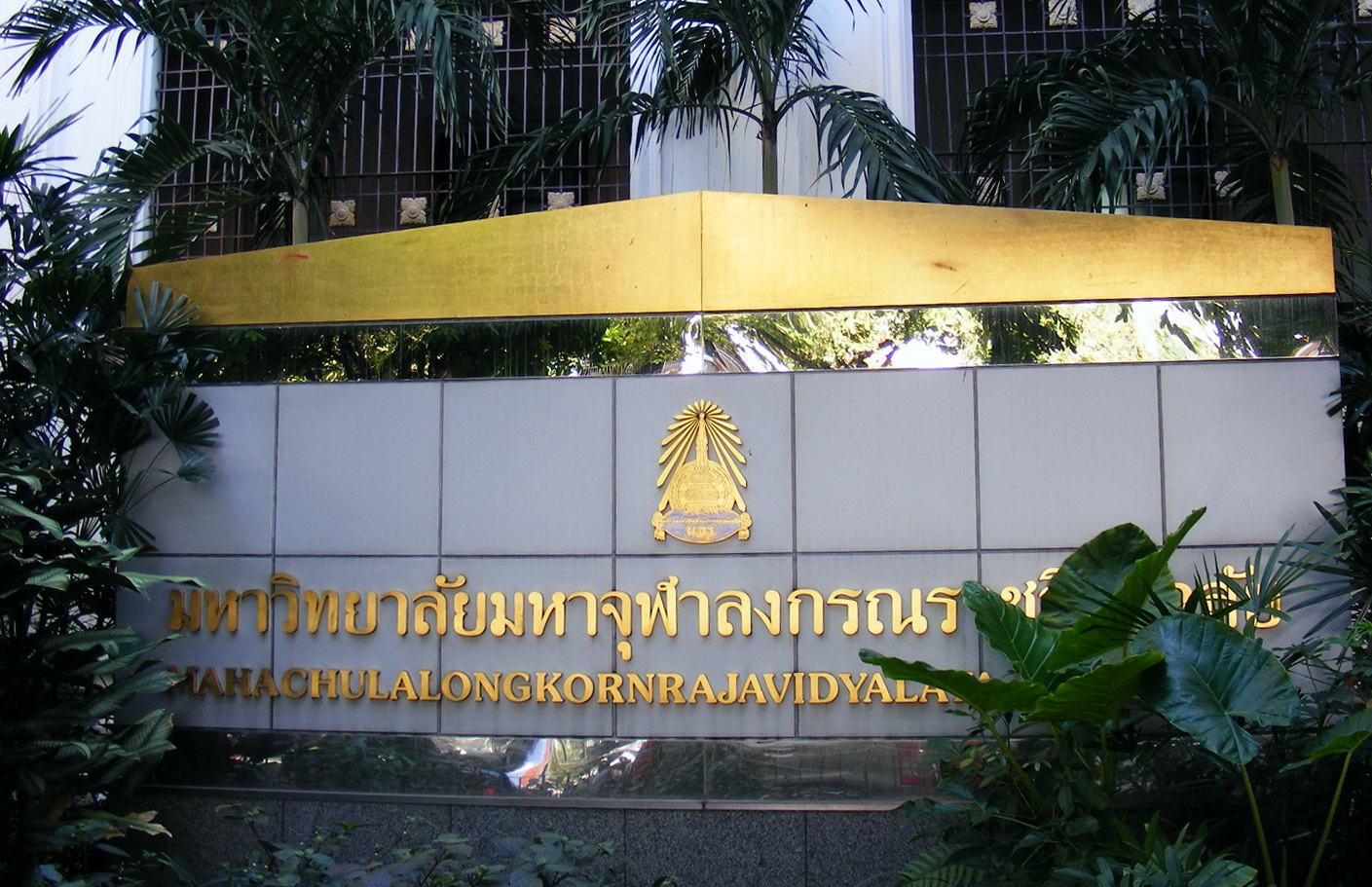
Mahachulalongkornrajavidyalaya University (Central Wat Mahathat Yuwarat Rangsarit Ratchaworamahawihan)

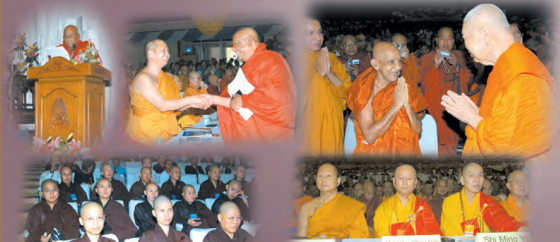
The 2nd World Vesak Conference between 18–21 May 2005 Mahachulalongkornrajavidyalaya University.

The university was founded in 1887 by King Chulalongkorn with the purpose of establishing a higher education institute for Buddhist monks, novices, and laypersons with an emphasis on Buddhist studies and other subjects. The university began offering classes in 1889. It adopted its current name in 1896.

By bills passed in 1997, both of Thailand's Buddhist universities — MCU and Mahamakut Buddhist University — became public universities.

== Colleges and faculties ==
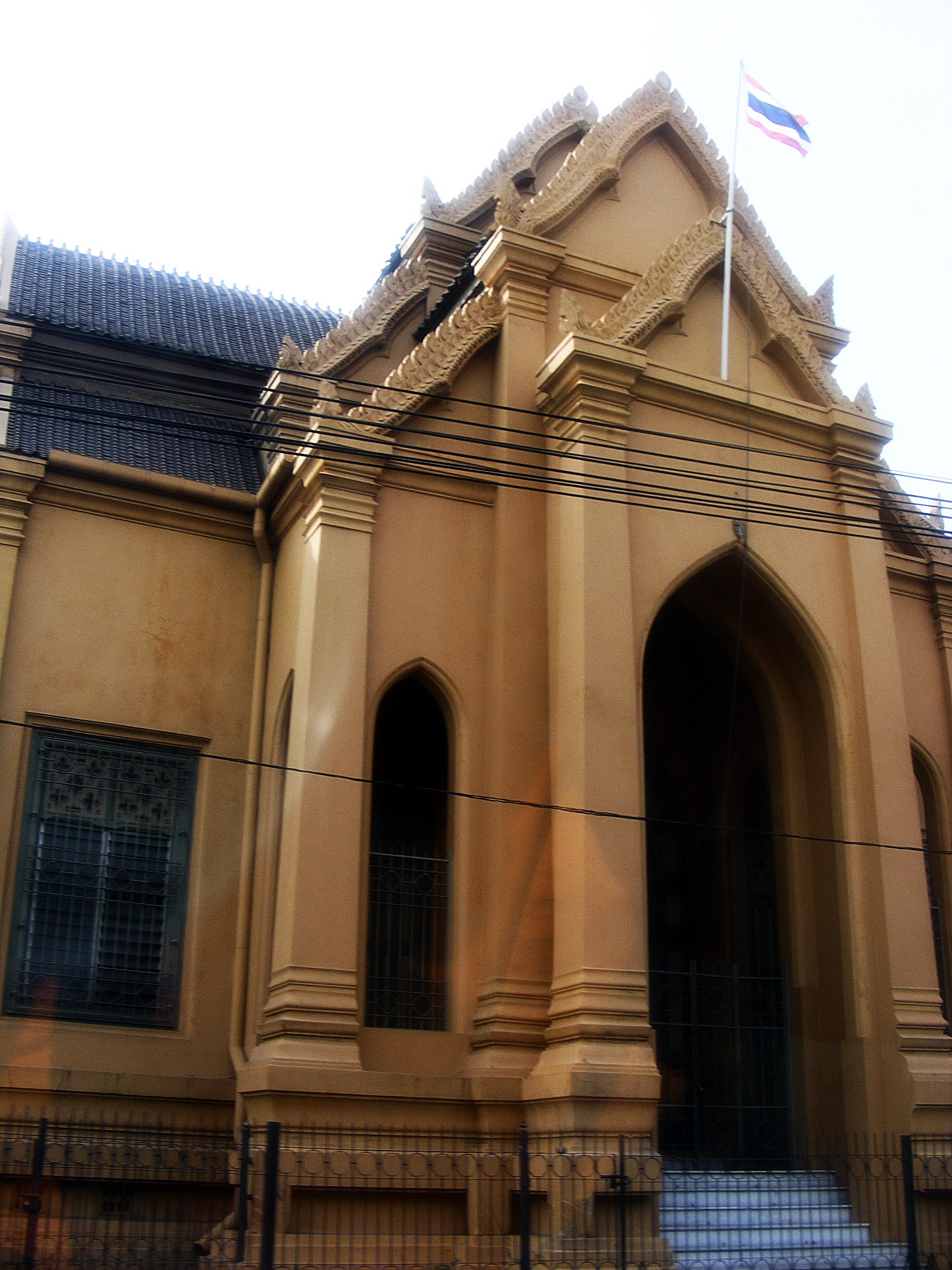
Thawornwatthu Building School building at Bali Triamudomsuksa School Mahachulalongkornrajavidyalaya University

Mahachulalongkornrajavidyalaya University is organized into several academic units: Faculty of Buddhist Studies, Faculty of Education, Faculty of Humanities, Faculty of Social Sciences, graduate school, and the International Buddhist Studies College.

The faculties offer 26 undergraduate programs, ten master's programs, two doctoral programs, and other academic training. Two of its master's programs, Buddhist studies and philosophy, are internationally oriented and conducted in English. MCU offers a PhD in Buddhist studies (in English).

== Campuses ==
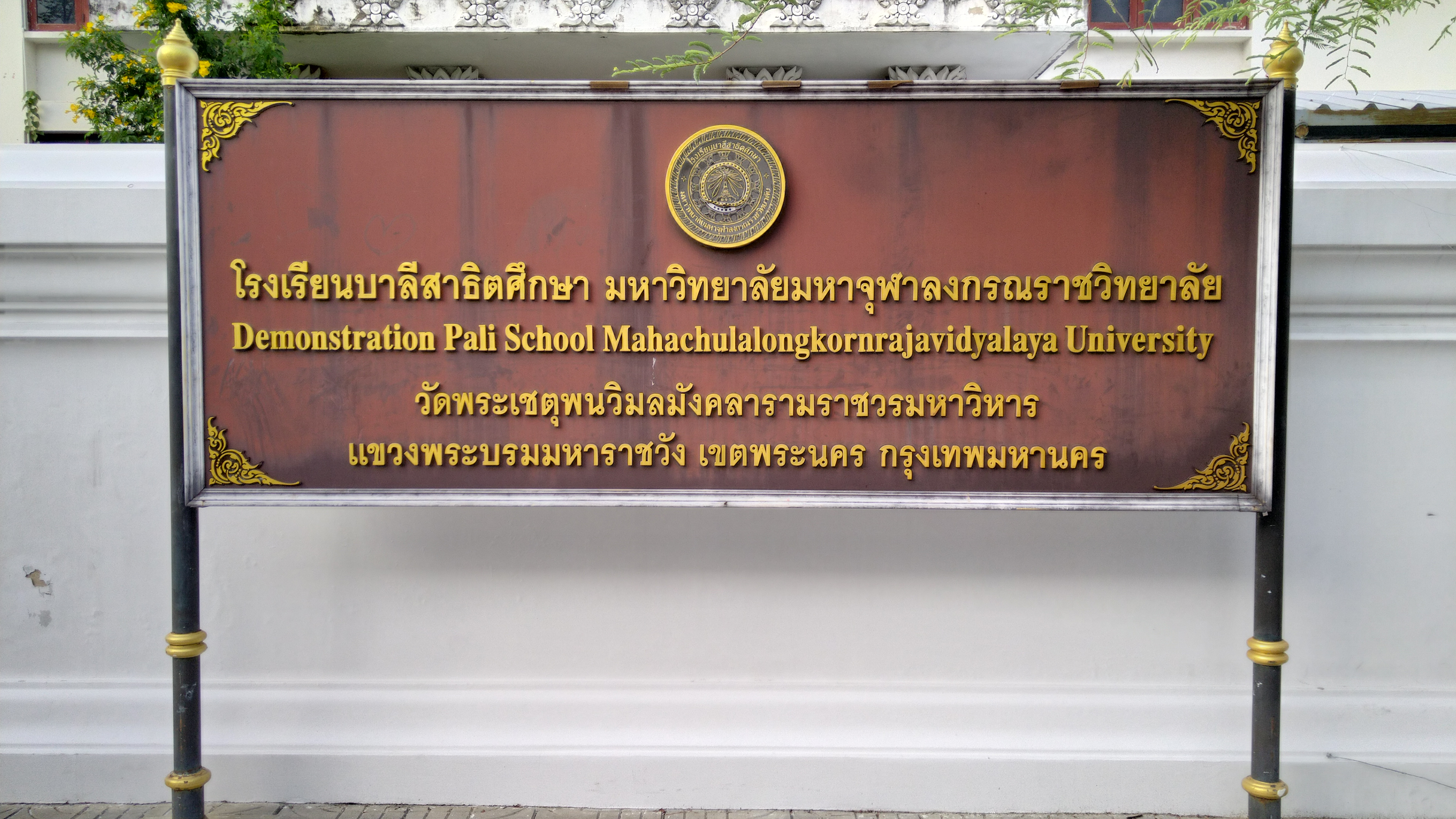
Demonstration Pali School

A new, larger main campus has been built in Wang Noi, Ayutthaya Province, just north of Bangkok. Classes have begun at the new location.

In addition to the main campus, Mahachulalongkornrajavidyalaya University has extension campuses in the following provinces:

- Chiang Mai
- Khon Kaen
- Lamphun
- Loei
- Nong Khai
- Nakhon Phanom
- Nakhon Pathom
- Nakhon Ratchasima
- Nakhon Sawan
- Nakhon Si Thammarat
- Phayao
- Phitsanulok
- Phrae
- Surin
- Ubon Ratchathani

The university hosts the Secretariat for the International Association of Buddhist Universities and is often one of the main organizers for the United Nations Day of Vesak Celebrations.

== Affiliation ==
The university has an affiliated college: Mahapanya Vidayalai at Hat Yai, Songkhla Province.

== See also ==
- List of Buddhist universities across the world
- International Buddhist Studies College
