= Ecclesiastical peerage of Thailand =

Thai Buddhist monks titles

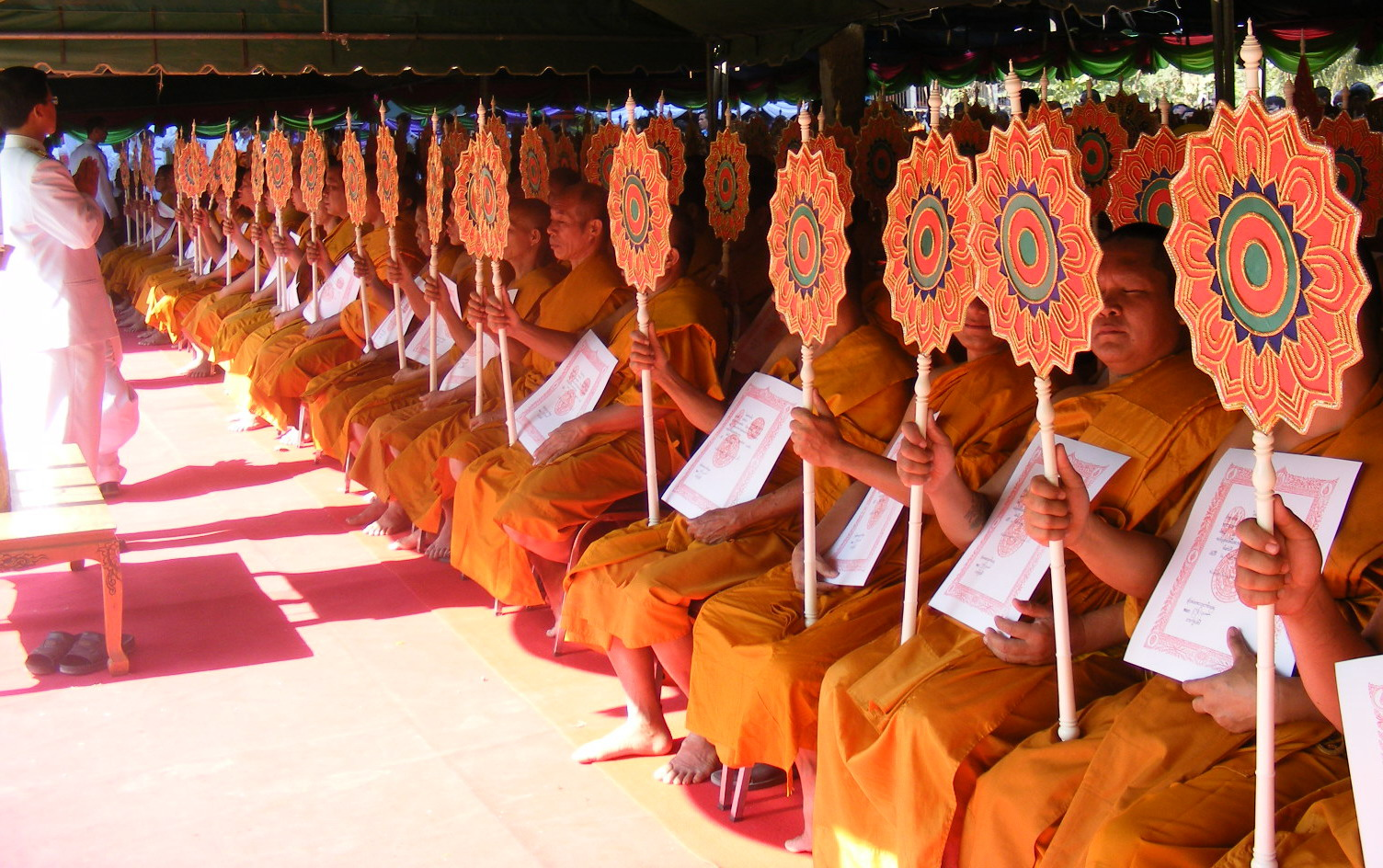
Ecclesiastical peers holding their letters of appointment and fans of rank.

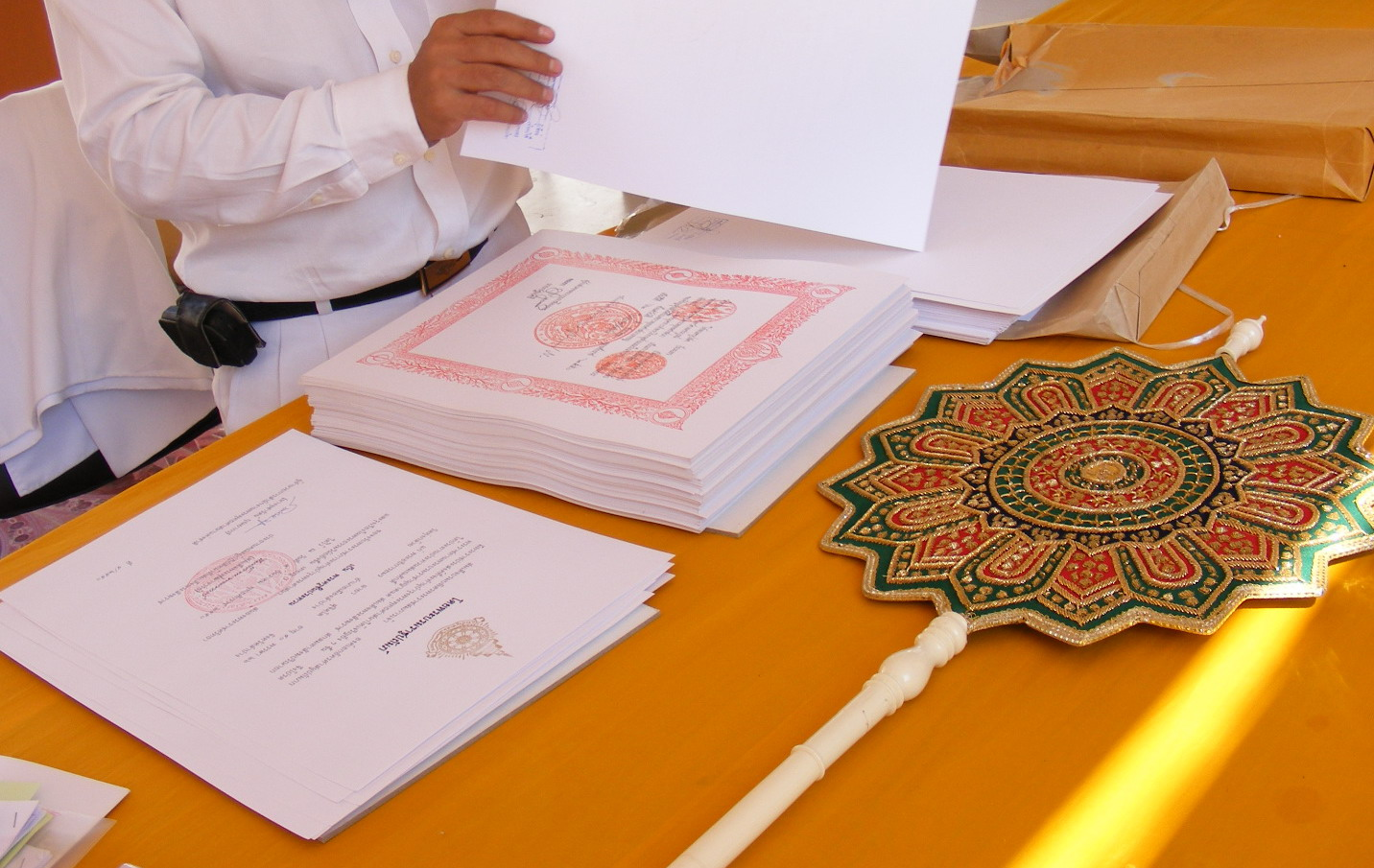
Letters of appointment and a fan of rank for ecclesiastical peers.

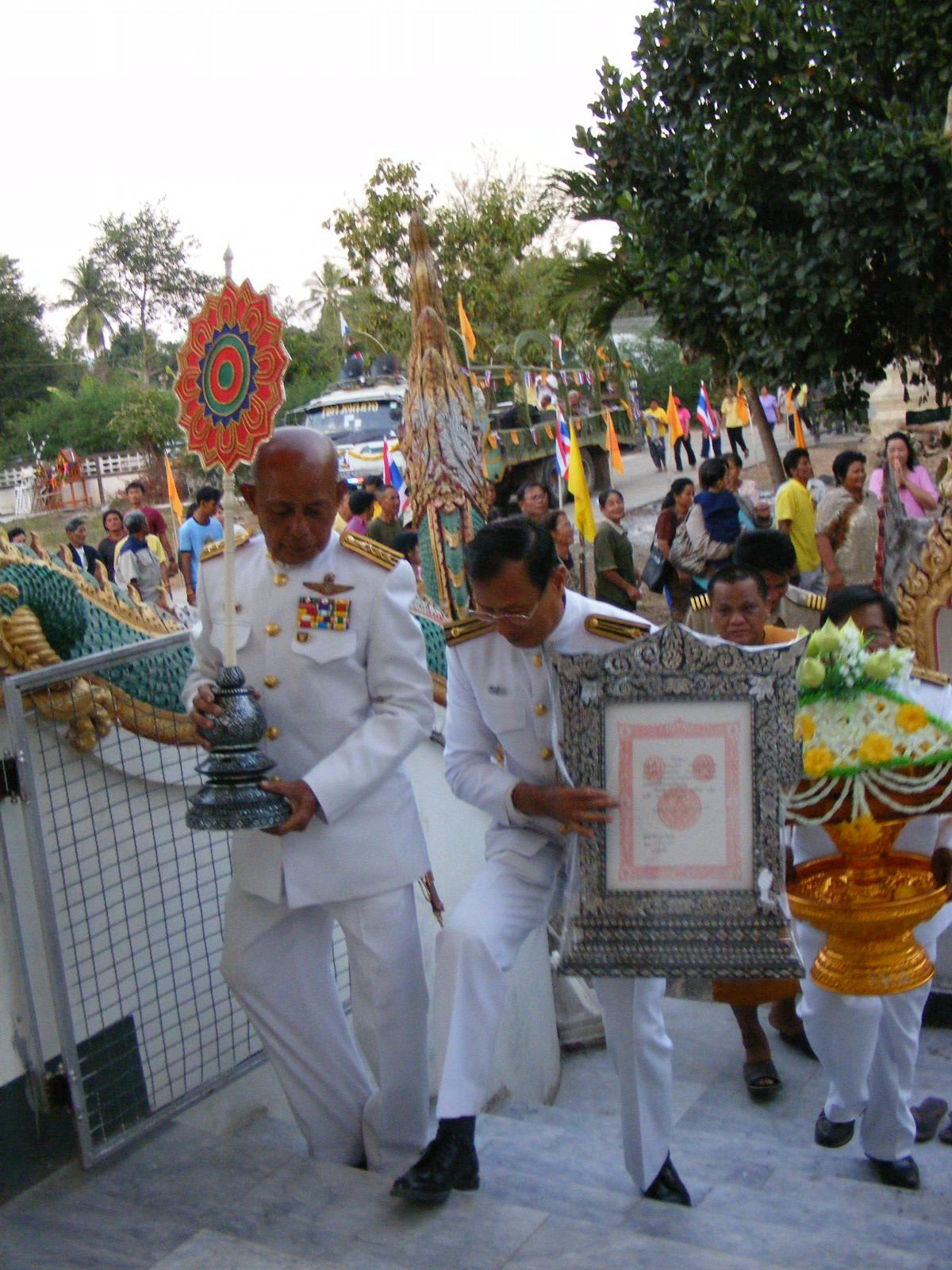
A monk parades his letter of appointment and fan of rank throughout the town of Uttaradit.

Ecclesiastical peerages (Thai: สมณศักดิ์; RTGS: samanasak; literally "ecclesiastical dignity") have traditionally been given to ordained members of the Thai sangha, the community of the Buddhist monks of Thailand.

Each ecclesiastical peer holds a rank (Thai: ยศ; RTGS: yot) and a title (Thai: ราชทินนาม; RTGS: ratchathinnanam). For example, Phra Dharma Kośācārya (Thai: พระธรรมโกศาจารย์; RTGS: Phra Tham Kosachan) is the title of a monk holding the rank of phra rachakhana (Thai: พระราชาคณะ) in the dharma class. In addition to an ecclesiastical peerage, a monk may also be known by a lay name (name as a layperson) and a dharmic name.

Holders of certain ranks are given fans of rank (Thai: พัดยศ; RTGS: phat yot).

== History ==
The custom of giving peerages to Buddhist priests originated in Sri Lanka and is believed to have been practiced in Thailand since the time of the Sukhothai Kingdom, during which the Sri Lanka's sect of Buddhism known as Laṅkāvaṃśa (Thai: ลังกาวงศ์) was prevalent in the region and it appears that Srī Śraddhā (Thai: ศรีศรัทธา; RTGS: Si Sattha), a nephew of King Pha Mueang, a local leader at that time, even travelled to the isle of Sri Lanka where he was ordained as a priest and was given a peerage. Stone inscriptions of that time mention such ecclesiastical titles as Mahāthēra (Thai: มหาเถร; RTGS: Mahathen) and Mahāsvāmī (Thai: มหาสวามี; RTGS: Mahasawami).

During the reign of King Mahathammaracha II of Sukhothai, the Buddhist community of Sukhothai was divided into two sects: araṇyavāsī (Thai: อรัญวาสี; RTGS: aranyawasi; literally "forest dwellers") and gāmavāsī (Thai: คามวาสี; RTGS: khammawasi; literally "village dwellers"). The patriarchs of both sects held the title Mahāthēra.

In the Ayutthaya Kingdom, the gāmavāsī sect was again divided into two subsects: the northern sect (Thai: หนเหนือ) and the southern sect (Thai: หนใต้). The patriarchs of the northern sect were styled Phra Vanaratna (Thai: พระวันรัตน์; RTGS: Phra Wannarat) or Phra Banaratna (Thai: พระพนรัตน์; RTGS: Phra Phonnarat) and those of the southern sect were styled Phra Buddhaghoṣācārya (Thai: พระพุทธโฆษาจารย์; RTGS: Phra Phutthakhosachan), whilst the patriarchs of the araṇyavāsī sect were styled Phra Buddhācārya (Thai: พระพุทธาจารย์; RTGS: Phra Phutthachan). It is also believed that senior monks had been appointed by the monarch of Ayuthaya as supreme patriarchs in charge of the entire monastic community.

In the subsequent kingdoms of Thon Buri and Rattanakosin, the same custom was practiced until the enactment of the Sangha Administration Statute 1902 (Thai: พระราชบัญญัติลักษณปกครองคณะสงฆ์ รัตนโกสินทรศก ๑๒๑) by King Rama V, which established a Sangha Supreme Council to nominate monks to the monarch to be appointed to peerages. This is upheld in the present Sangha Act 1962 (Thai: พระราชบัญญัติคณะสงฆ์ พ.ศ. ๒๕๐๕), except the appointment of the supreme patriarch which has been amended in January 2017 to solely be at the monarch's pleasure in line with the previous tradition.

== Ranks and titles ==
At present, the ranks and titles given to members of the Thai sangha are as follows (from highest to lowest):

=== Supreme patriarch ===
Supreme patriarch (Thai: สมเด็จพระสังฆราช; RTGS: somdet phra sangkharat) is the highest rank in the Thai sangha. A supreme patriarch who is a member of the royal family is called somdet phra sangkharat chao (Thai: สมเด็จพระสังฆราชเจ้า), whilst one who is a commoner is merely called somdet phra sangkharat.

At present, all the supreme patriarchs are appointed by the monarch of Thailand and are titled Ariyavaṃśāgatañāṇa (Thai: อริยวงศาคตญาณ; RTGS: Ariyawongsakhatayan), prefixed by the honorific Somdet Phra (Thai: สมเด็จพระ).

=== Somdet phra rachakhana ===
Somdet phra rachakhana (Thai: สมเด็จพระราชาคณะ) is the second highest rank in the Thai sangha after the supreme patriarch. At present, somdet phra rachakhana are appointed by the monarch of Thailand and there can only be eight somdet phra rachakhana: four from the Mahā Nikāya sect and the other four from the Dhammayuttika Nikāya sect.

The titles for somdet phra rachakhana, each prefixed by the honorific Somdet Phra (Thai: สมเด็จพระ), are as follows:

Title	In Thai	
Title	Vernacular	RTGS romanised
Ariyavaṃśāgatañāṇa	อริยวงศาคตญาณ	Ariyawongsakhatayan
Buḍhācārya	พุฒาจารย์	Phuthachan
Buddhaghoṣācārya	พุทธโฆษาจารย์	Phutthakhosachan
Buddhajinavaṃṥa	พุทธชินวงศ์	Phutthachinnawong
Buddhapābacanapatī	พุทธปาพจนบดี	Phutthapaphotchanabodi
Dhīrañāṇamunī	ธีรญาณมุนี	Thirayanamuni
Mahādhīrācārya	มหาธีราจารย์	Mahathirachan
Mahāmunīvaṃṥa	มหามุนีวงศ์	Mahamuniwong
Mahārajamaṇgalācārya	มหารัชมังคลาจารย์	Maharatchamangkhalachan
Mahāvīravaṃṥa	มหาวีรวงศ์	Mahawirawong
Ñāṇasaṃvara	ญาณสังวร	Yanasangwon
Ñāṇavarottama	ญาณวโรดม	Yanawarodom
Vajirañāṇavaṃṥa	วชิรญาณวงศ์	Wachirayanawong
Vanarata	วันรัต	Wannarat

=== Phra rachakhana ===
Phra rachakhana (Thai: พระราชาคณะ) is the third highest rank in the Thai sangha, divided into two classes: special (Thai: พิเศษ) and ordinary (Thai: สามัญ).

At present, phra rachakhana are appointed by the monarch of Thailand, except those in the saman yok group of the ordinary class who are appointed by the supreme patriarch.

The title chao khun (Thai: เจ้าคุณ) is often used colloquially for monks with the rank of phra rachakhana.

==== Special classes ====
There are four special classes:

- Chao khana rong (Thai: เจ้าคณะรอง): 13 posts available for the Mahā Nikāya sect and 7 for the Dhammayuttika Nikāya sect, being 20 in total. Members of this class have the honorific Phra (Thai: พระ) prefixed to their titles, such as:

Title	In Thai	
Title	Vernacular	RTGS romanised
Phra Brahma Guṇābharaṇa	พระพรหมคุณาภรณ์	Phra Phrom Khunaphon
Phra Brahma Munī	พระพรหมมุนี	Phra Phrom Muni
Phra Śāsanasobhaṇa	พระศาสนโสภณ	Phra Satsanasophon
Phra Sudharmādhipatī	พระสุธรรมาธิบดี	Phra Suthammathibodi

- Dharma (Thai: ธรรม; RTGS: tham): 30 posts available for Mahā Nikāya and 15 for Dhammayuttika Nikāya, being 45 in total. Members of this class have the honorific Phra Dharma (Thai: พระธรรม; RTGS: Phra Tham) prefixed to their titles, such as:

Title	In Thai	
Title	Vernacular	RTGS romanised
Phra Dharma Kośācārya	พระธรรมโกศาจารย์	Phra Tham Kosachan
Phra Dharma Rājānuvatra	พระธรรมราชานุวัตร	Phra Tham Rachanuwat
Phra Dharma Śīlācārya	พระธรรมศีลาจารย์	Phra Tham Silachan
Phra Dharma Visuddhimaṇgala	พระธรรมวิสุทธิมงคล	Phra Tham Wisutthimongkhon

- Dēba (Thai: เทพ; RTGS: thep): 56 posts available for Mahā Nikāya and 30 for Dhammayuttika Nikāya, being 86 in total. Members of this class have the honorific Phra Dēba (Thai: พระเทพ; RTGS: Phra Thep) prefixed to their titles, such as:

Title	In Thai	
Title	Vernacular	RTGS romanised
Phra Dēba Guṇādhāra	พระเทพคุณาธาร	Phra Thep Khunathan
Phra Dēba Ñāṇamaṇgala	พระเทพญาณมงคล	Phra Thep Yanamongkhon
Phra Dēba Siddhācārya	พระเทพสิทธาจารย์	Phra Thep Sitthachan
Phra Dēba Vidyāgama	พระเทพวิทยาคม	Phra Thep Witthayakhom

- Rāja (Thai: ราช; RTGS: rat): 135 posts available for Mahā Nikāya and 54 for Dhammayuttika Nikāya, being 189 in total. Members of this class have the honorific Phra Rāja (Thai: พระราช; RTGS: Phra Rat) prefixed to their titles, such as:

Title	In Thai	
Title	Vernacular	RTGS romanised
Phra Rāja Bhāvanavikrama	พระราชภาวนาวิกรม	Phra Rat Phawanawikrom
Phra Rāja Dharmanidēśa	พระราชธรรมนิเทศ	Phra Rat Thammanithet
Phra Rāja Sumēdhācārya	พระราชสุเมธาจารย์	Phra Rat Sumethachan
Phra Rāja Visuddhiprajānātha	พระราชวิสุทธิประชานาถ	Phra Rat Wisut Prachanat

==== Ordinary class ====
There are 477 posts available in the ordinary class, with 348 for Mahā Nikāya and 129 for Dhammayuttika Nikāya.

Members of this class have the honorific Phra (Thai: พระ) prefixed to their titles, such as:

Title	In Thai	
Title	Vernacular	RTGS romanised
Phra Cullanāyaka	พระจุลนายก	Phra Chunlanayok
Phra Ñāṇavisāla Thēra	พระญาณวิสาลเถร	Phra Yanawisan Thera
Phra Maṇgala Sundara	พระมงคลสุนทร	Phra Mongkhon Sunthon
Phra Siddhikāra Kośala	พระสิทธิการโกศล	Phra Sitthikan Koson

Phra rachakhana in the ordinary class are also divided into four groups:

- Parian (Thai: เปรียญ)
- Parian-equivalent (Thai: เทียบเปรียญ)
- Vipassanā (Thai: วิปัสสนา; RTGS: wipatsana)
- Saman yok (Thai: สามัญยก)

=== Phra khru ===
Phra khru (Thai: พระครู) is the lowest rank in the Thai sangha, divided into three classes:

- Sanyabat (Thai: สัญญาบัตร): appointed by the monarch of Thailand in an unlimited number.
- Thananukrom (Thai: ฐานานุกรม): appointed by special-class phra rachakhana in the number specified in the letter of appointment of each phra rachakhana.
- Prathuan (Thai: ประทวน): appointed by the Thai sangha in an unlimited number.

Holders of this rank have the honorific Phra Khru prefixed to their titles, such as:

Title	In Thai	
Title	Vernacular	RTGS romanised
Phra Khru Ñāṇasāgara	พระครูญาณสาคร	Phra Khru Yanasakhon
Phra Khru Paññā Vuḍḍhi Sundara	พระครูปัญญาวุฒิสุนทร	Phra Khru Panya Wut Sunthon
Phra Khru Pavara Dharmakicca	พระครูบวรธรรมกิจ	Phra Khru Bowon Thammakit
Phra Khru Vimala Guṇākara	พระครูวิมลคุณากร	Phra Khru Wimon Khunakon
