= Wat Mahathat Yuwaratrangsarit =

Buddhist temple in Bangkok, Thailand

- วัดมหาธาตุยุวราชรังสฤษฎิ์
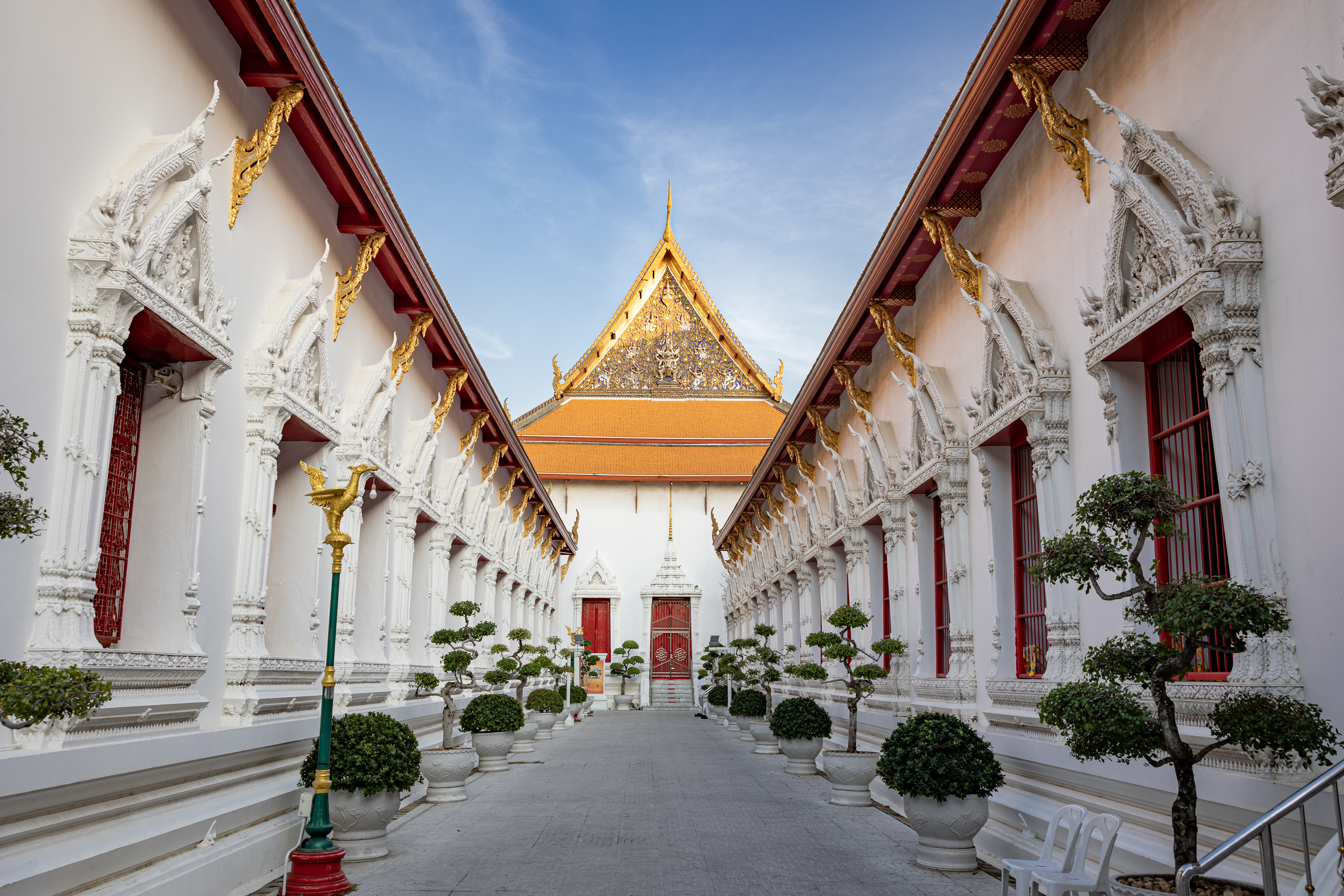

- Location within Bangkok

Religion
- Affiliation: Buddhism
- Sect: Theravāda
- Leadership: Phra Phromwachirathibodi (abbot)
- Status: First-class royal temple of the ratchaworamahawihan grade

Location
- Interactive map of Wat Mahathat Yuwaratrangsarit
- Coordinates: 13°45′18″N 100°29′27″E

Wat Mahathat Yuwaratrangsarit (Thai: วัดมหาธาตุยุวราชรังสฤษฎิ์) is a Buddhist temple in Bangkok, Thailand. It is one of only six first-class royal temples of the ratchaworamahawihan grade in Thailand. Its monks belong to the Mahā Nikāya.

== History ==
Built during the Ayutthaya period (1351–1767), the temple was then known as Wat Salak. Soon after Bangkok was established as the capital of Siam, the temple became strategically situated between the newly built Grand Palace and Front Palace (residence of the vice-king). As a result, the temple was used for royal ceremonies and funerals.

Throughout the past two centuries, the temple has been renovated and elevated in status by many Thai kings and royalties. It became the Wat Mahathat of Bangkok in 1803 and was given its current name in 1996. The temple is also home to Vipassana Meditation centre.

== University ==
Mahachulalongkornrajavidyalaya University, Thailand's oldest higher education institute for Buddhist monks, is on the temple grounds. This is one of the most important universities in Thailand, split into faculty of human sciences, social sciences, an international programme, and a graduate college. The first class was admitted in 1889 and by 1997, both universities became public universities.

== Media ==
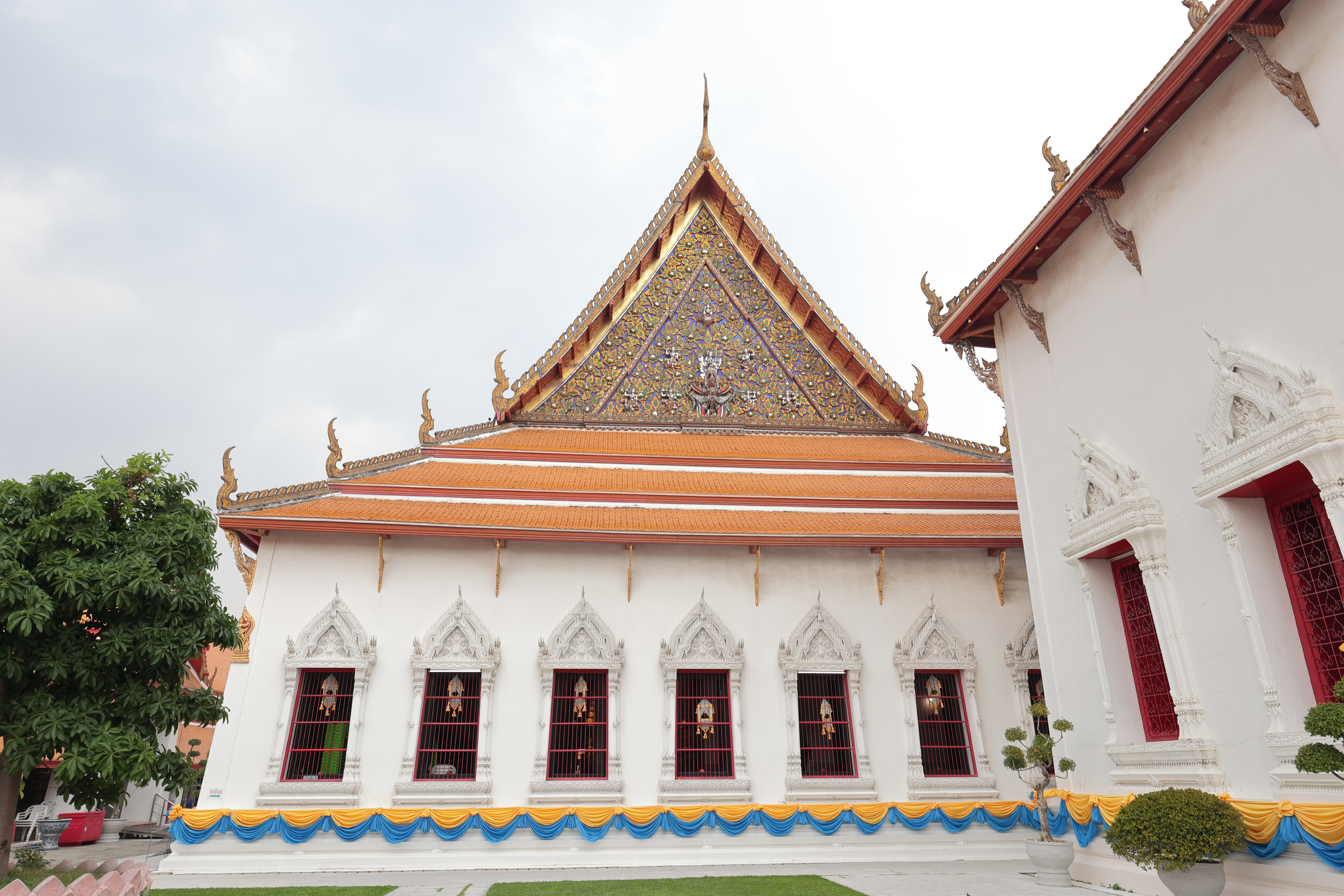
Phra ubosot

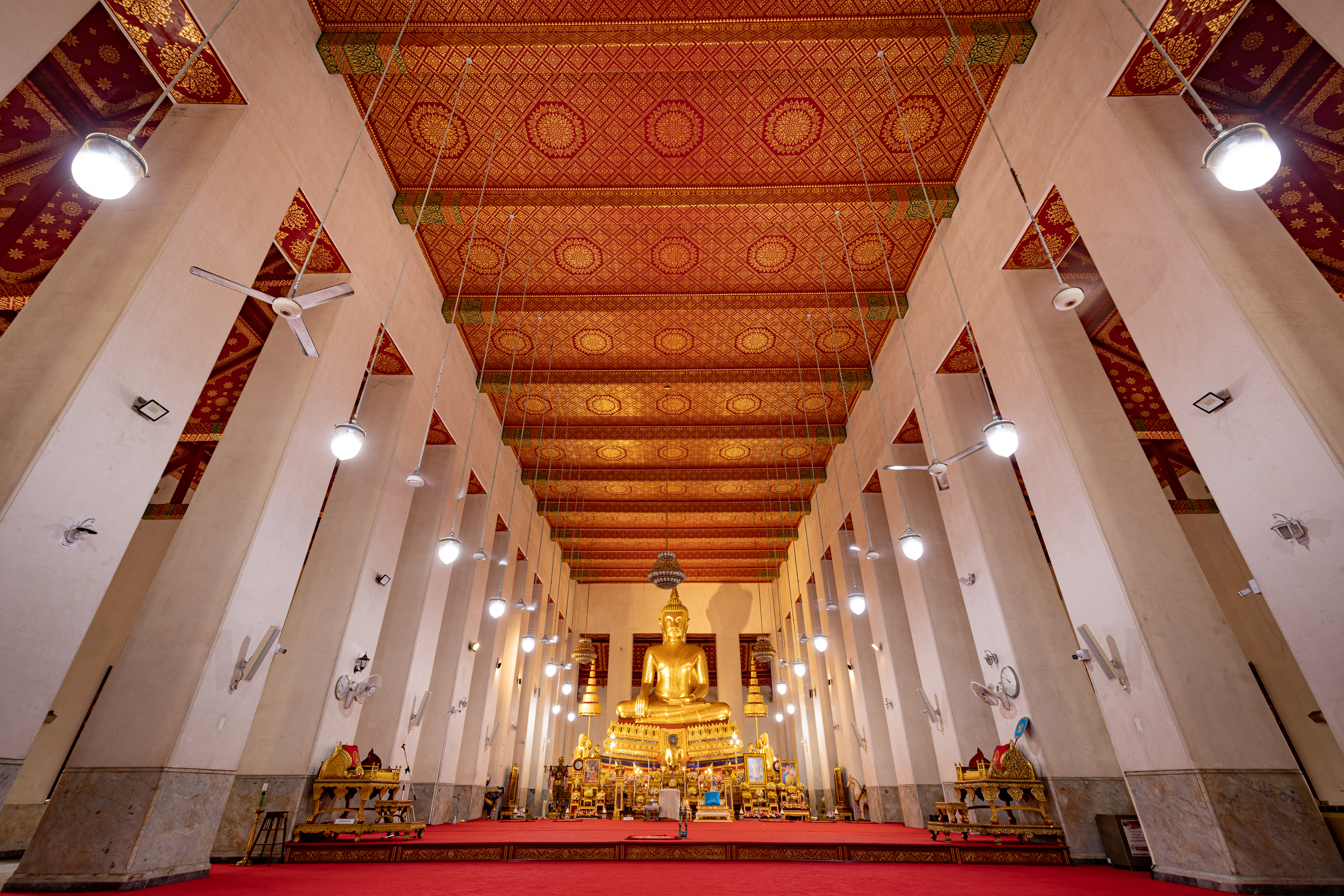
Interior of the Phra ubosot

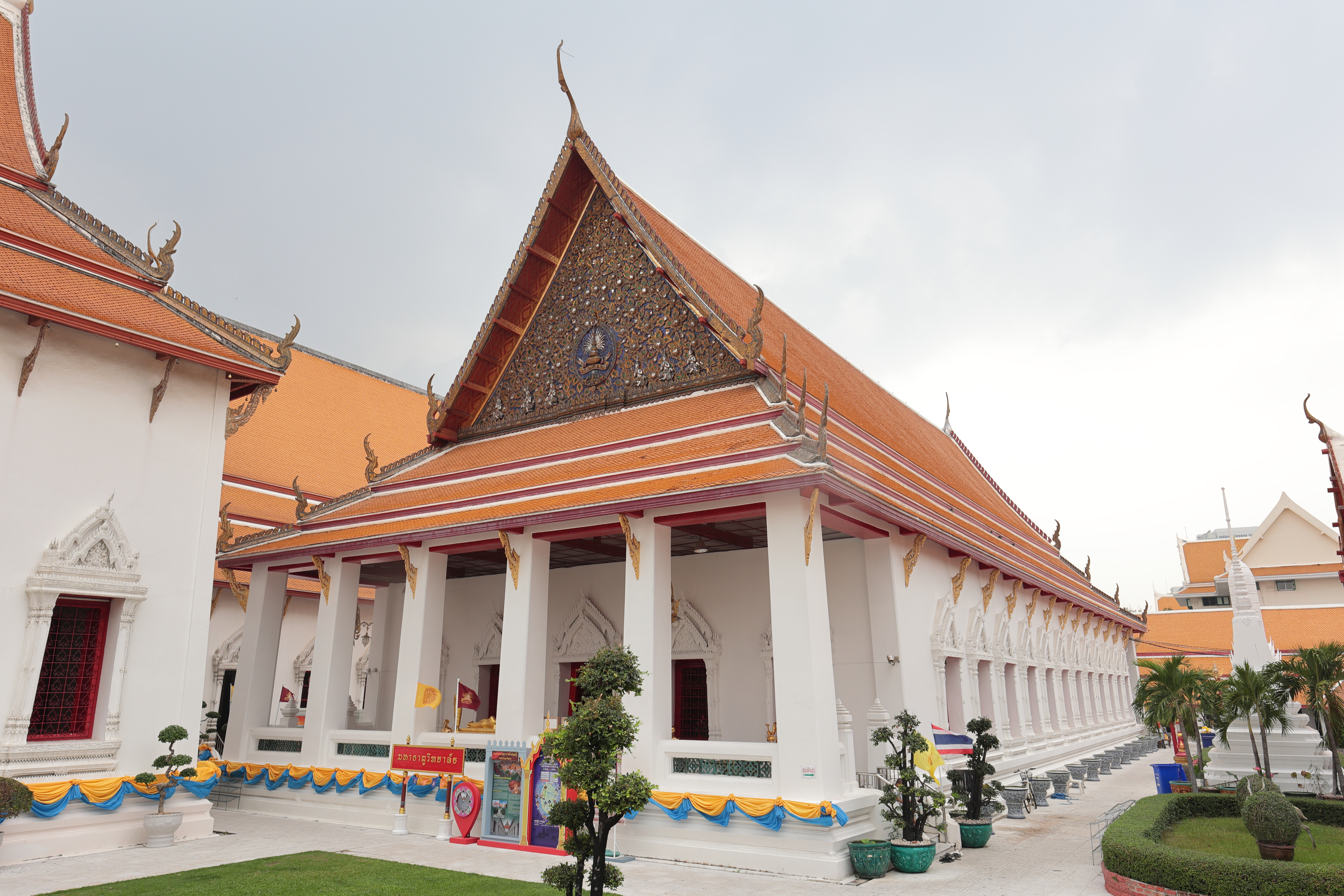
Phra vihara

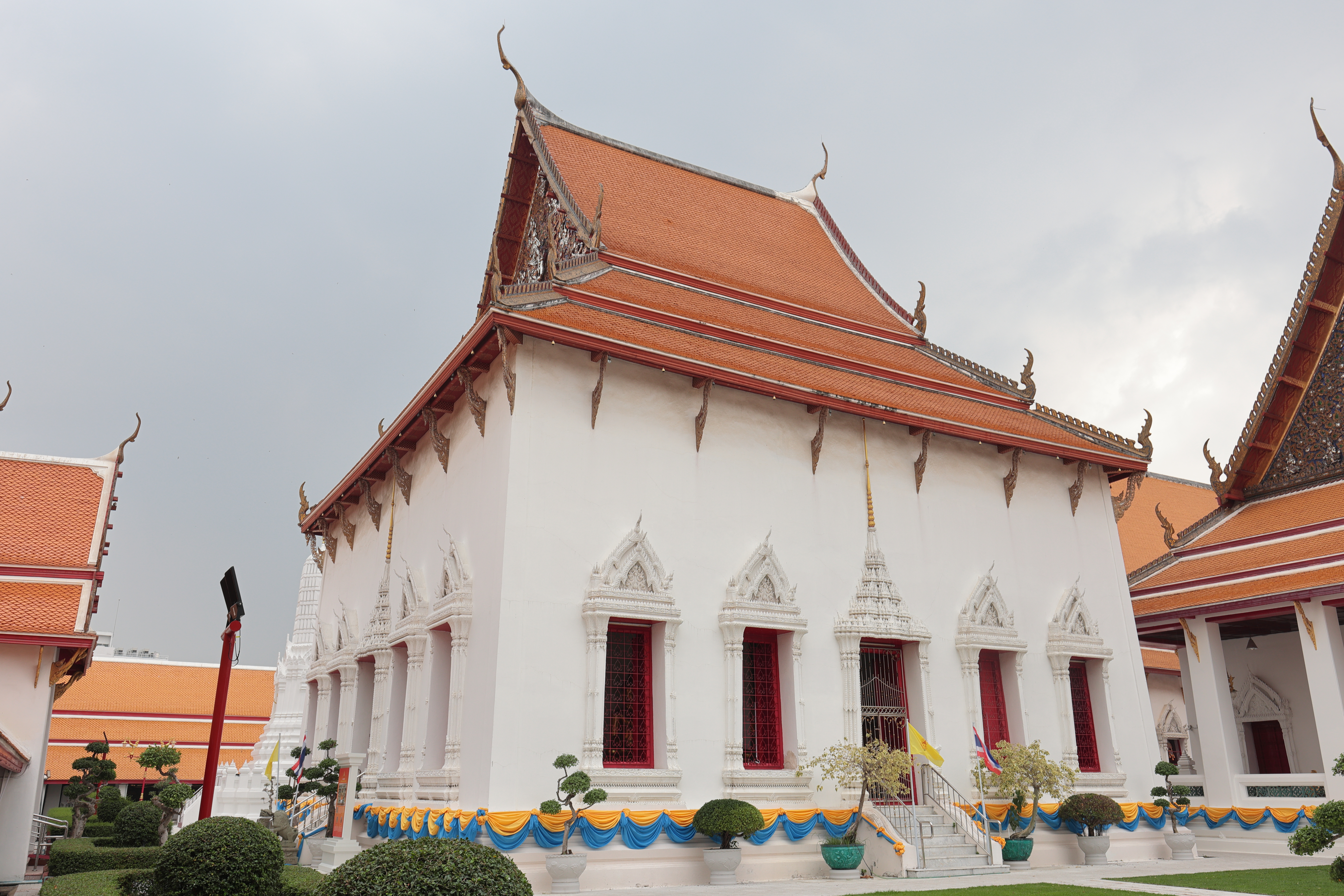
Phra mondop

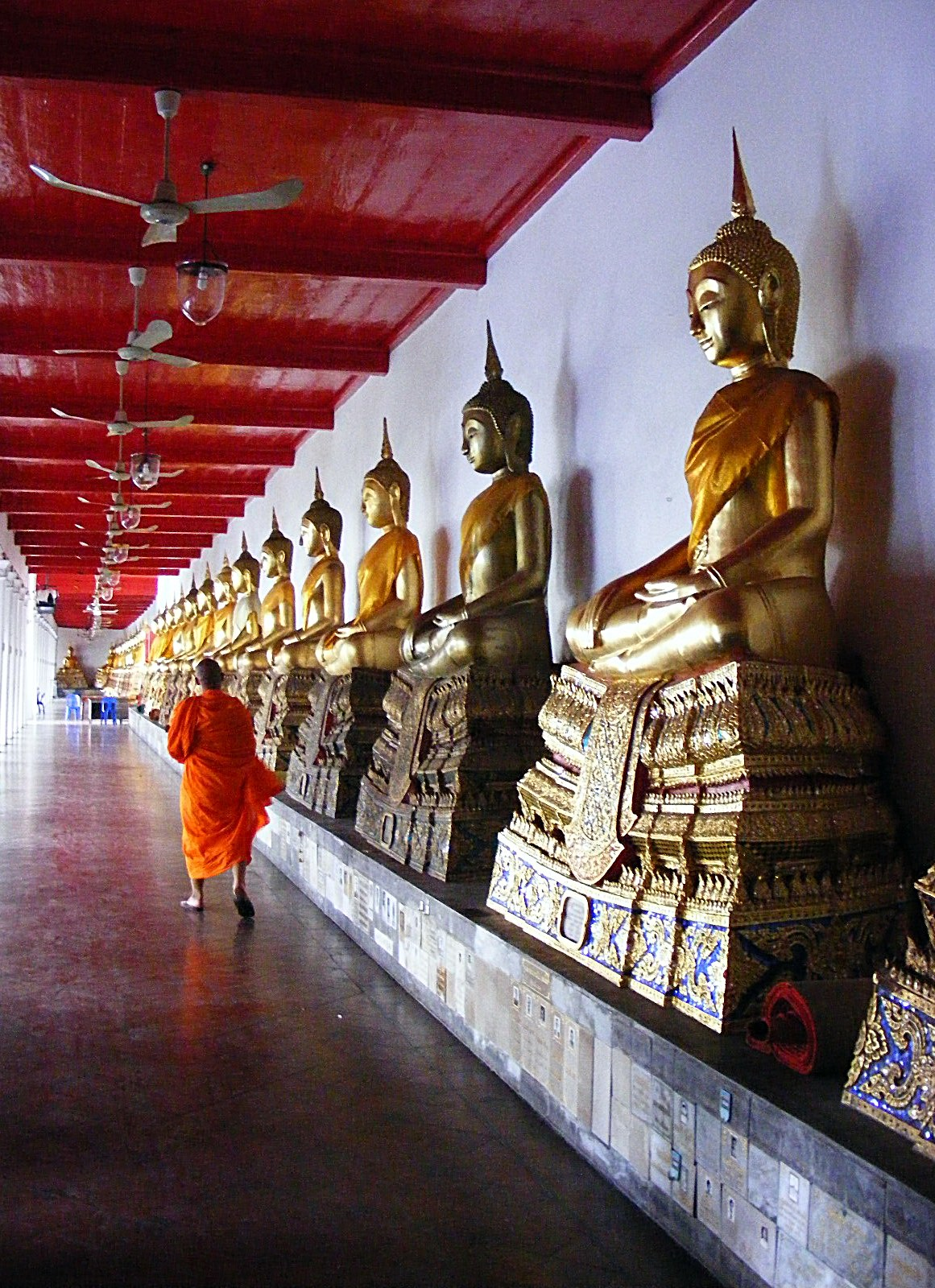
Buddha idols along a walkway

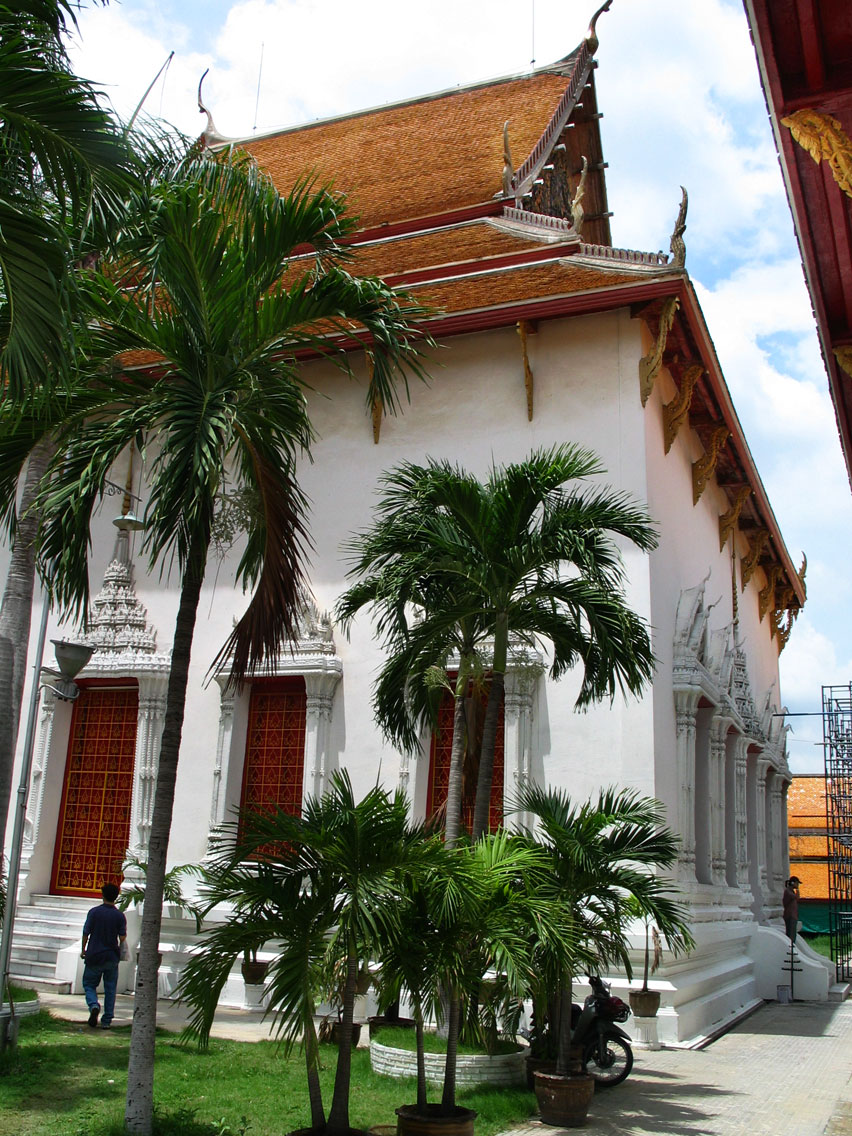
Wat Mahathat temple building

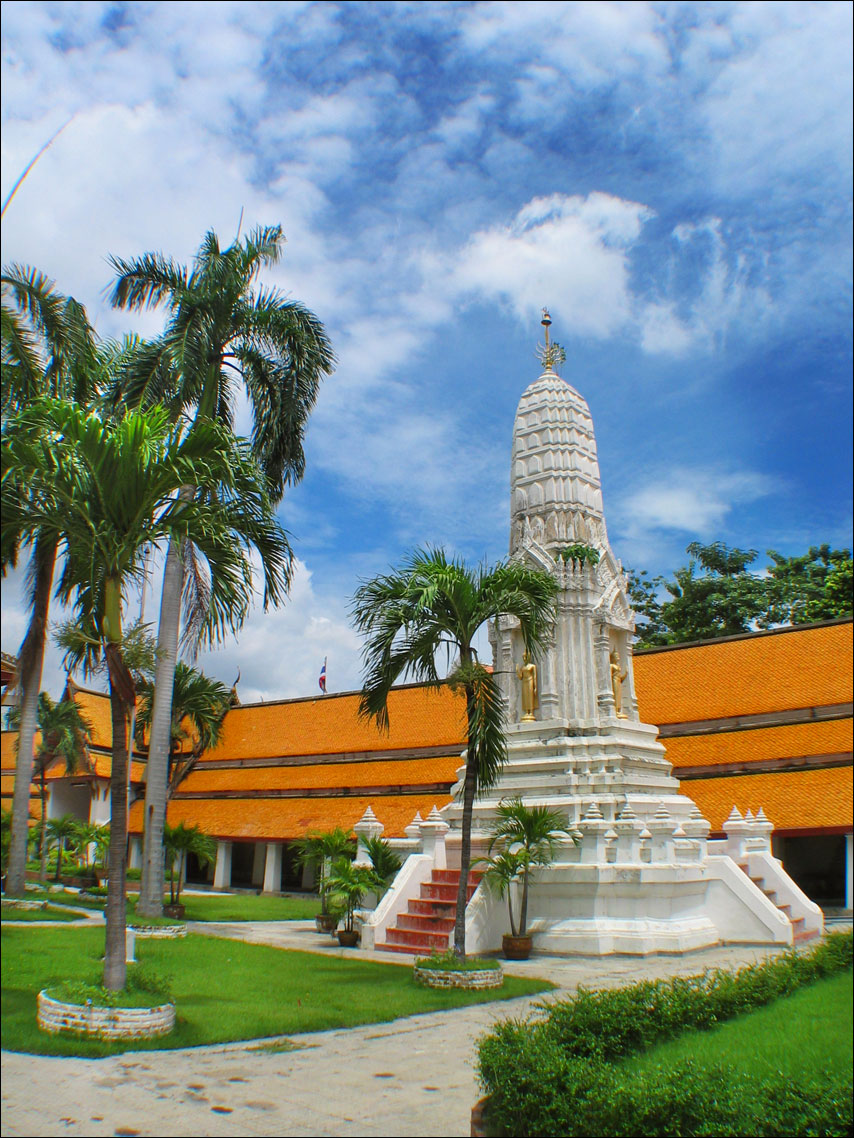
Pagoda

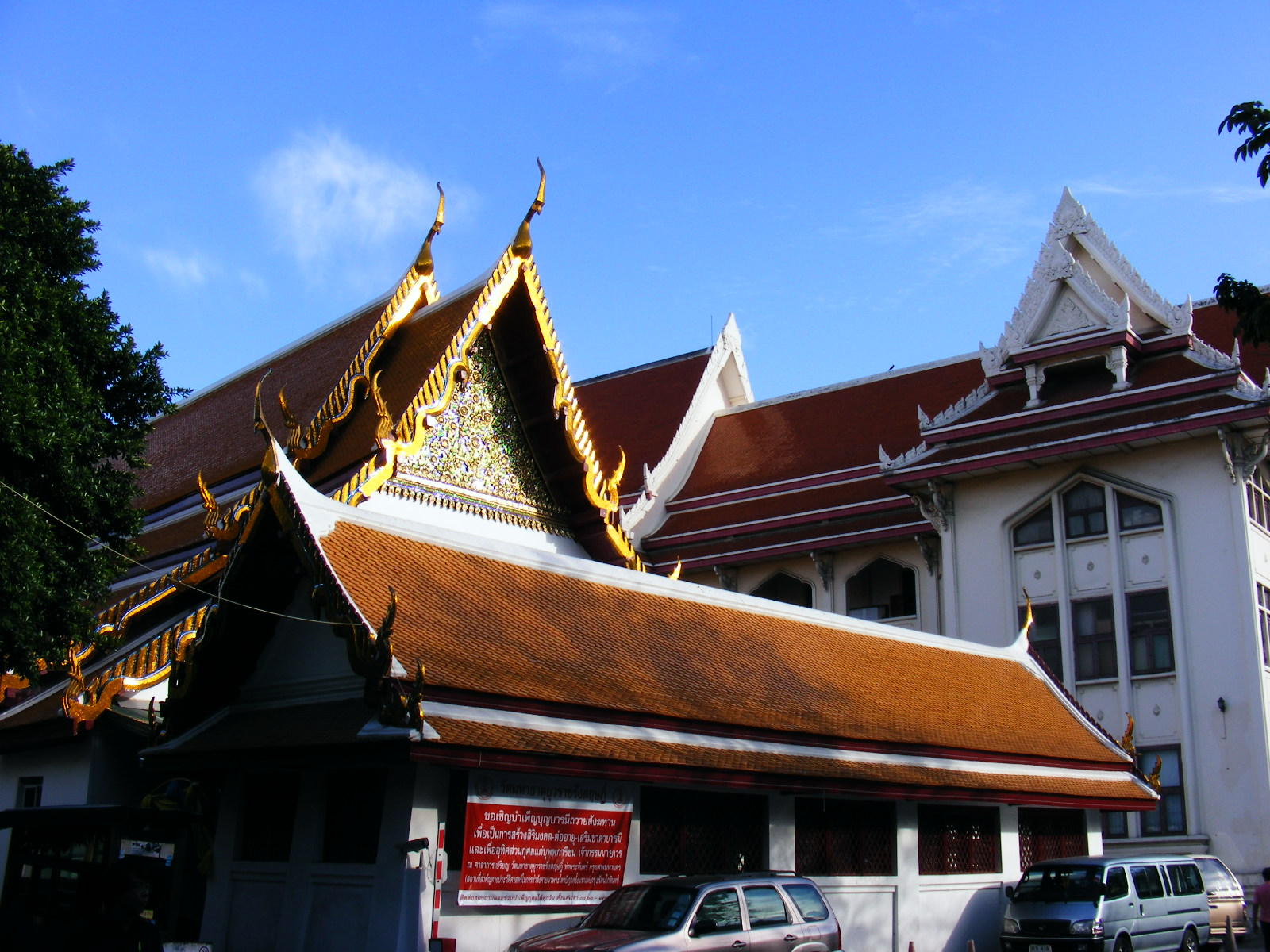
Mahachulalongkornrajavi-dyalaya University

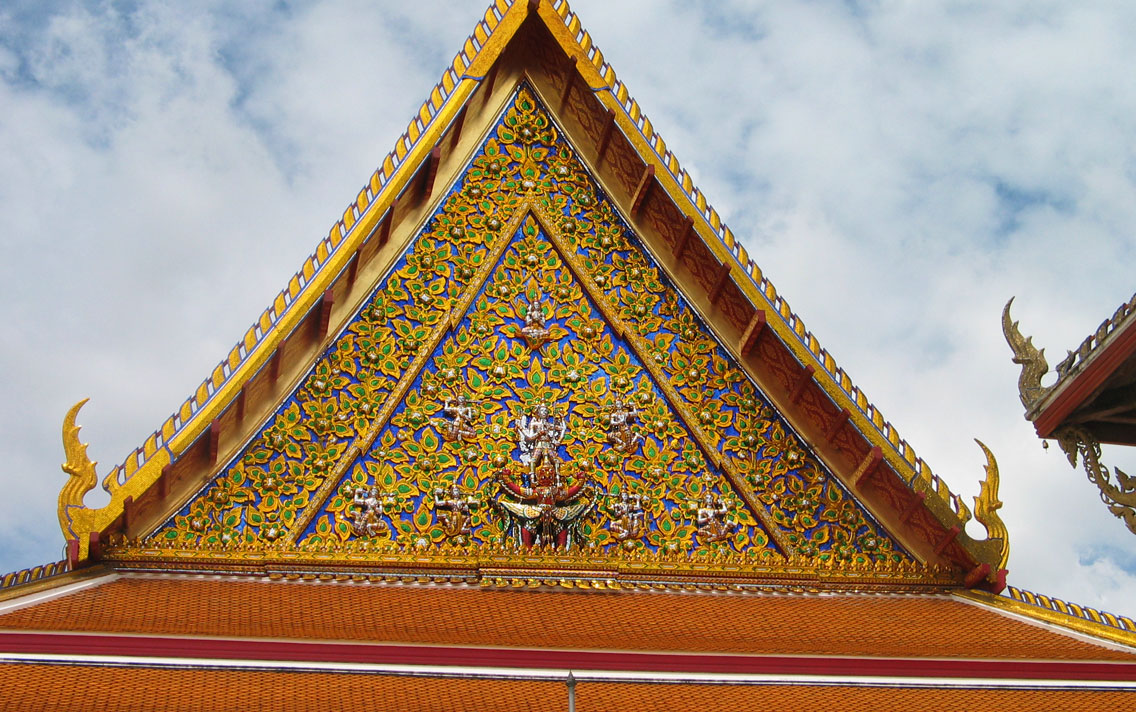
Temple roof

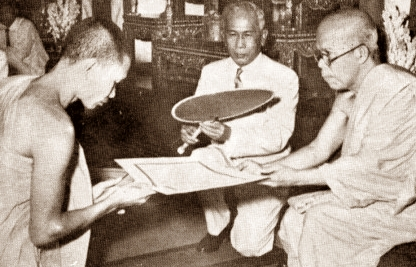
Thai PM at the time, Phibul (centre), joining the graduation ceremony of the Mahachulalongkornrajavidyalaya's first class.

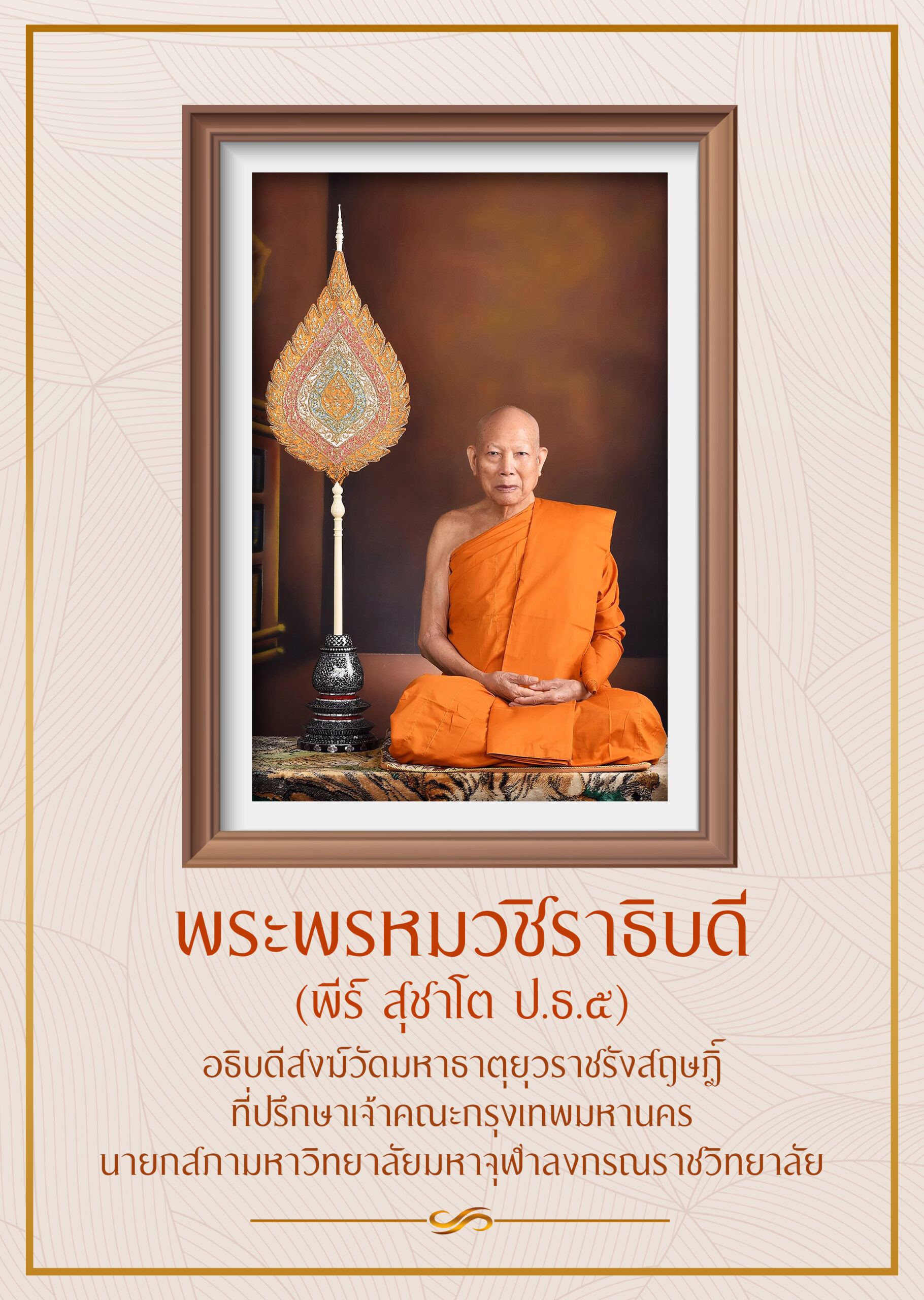
Abbot
