= Ariyavangsagatayana =

Ariyavangsagatayana or Ariyavongsagatanana (Pali: Ariyavaṃsāgatañāṇa) may refer to:

- Ariyavangsagatayana (Ou) (Ariyavangsagatayana I), 1st Thai monks who hold the title of Somdet Phra Ariyavangsagatayana and 1st abbot of Wat Suthat, not hold the position of Supreme Patriarch of Thailand
- Ariyavangsagatayana (Sa Pussadeva) (Ariyavangsagatayana II), 9th Supreme Patriarch of Thailand (r. 1893–1899)
- Ariyavangsagatayana (Pae Tissadeva) (Ariyavangsagatayana III), 12th Supreme Patriarch of Thailand (r. 1938–1944)
- Ariyavongsagatayana (Plod Kittisobhano) (Ariyavangsagatayana IV), 14th Supreme Patriarch of Thailand (r. 1960–1962)
- Ariyavangsagatayana (Yoo Ñāṇodayo) (Ariyavangsagatayana V), 15th Supreme Patriarch of Thailand (r. 1963–1965)
- Ariyavangsagatayana (Chuan Utthayi) (Ariyavangsagatayana VI), 16th Supreme Patriarch of Thailand (r. 1965–1971)
- Ariyavangsagatayana (Pun Puṇṇasiri) (Ariyavangsagatayana VII) 17th Supreme Patriarch of Thailand (r. 1972–1973)
- Ariyavangsagatayana (Vasana Vāsano) (Ariyavangsagatayana VIII) 18th Supreme Patriarch of Thailand (r. 1973–1988), posthumously elevated to the title "Somdet Phra Sangharaj Chao Krommaluang Jinavaralongkorn" in 2019.
- Ariyavangsagatayana (Amborn Ambaro) (Ariyavangsagatayana IX) 20th and current Supreme Patriarch of Thailand since 2017.
