= Tantra =

Esoteric traditions of Hinduism and Buddhism

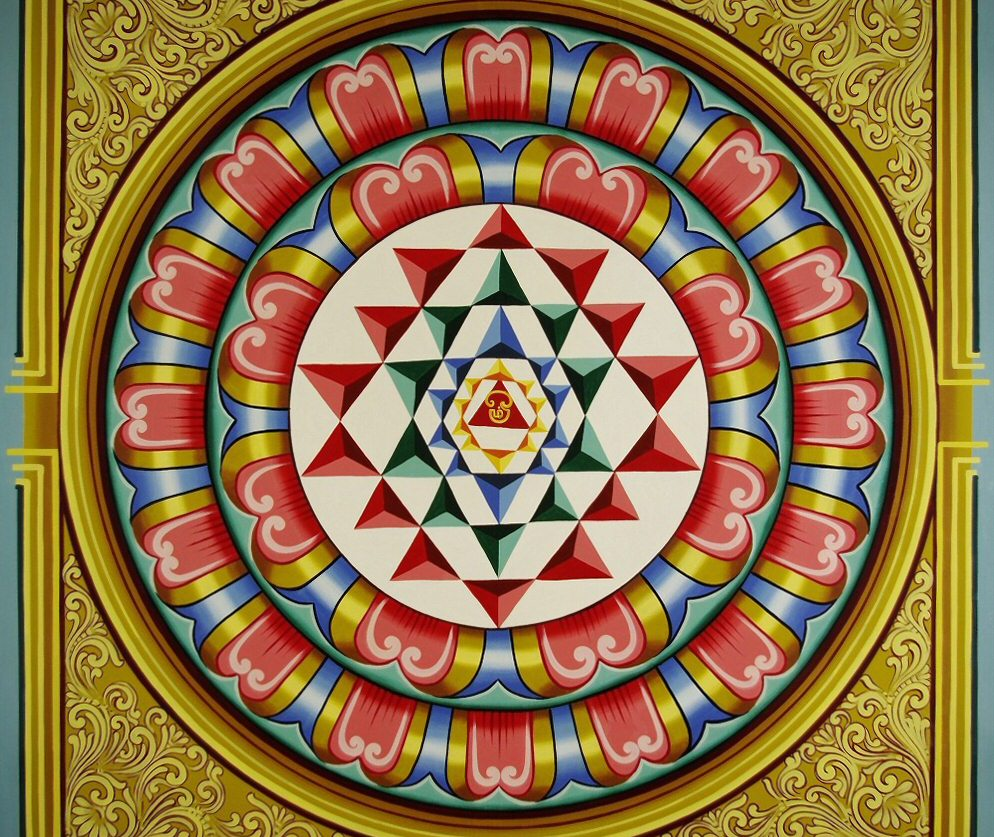
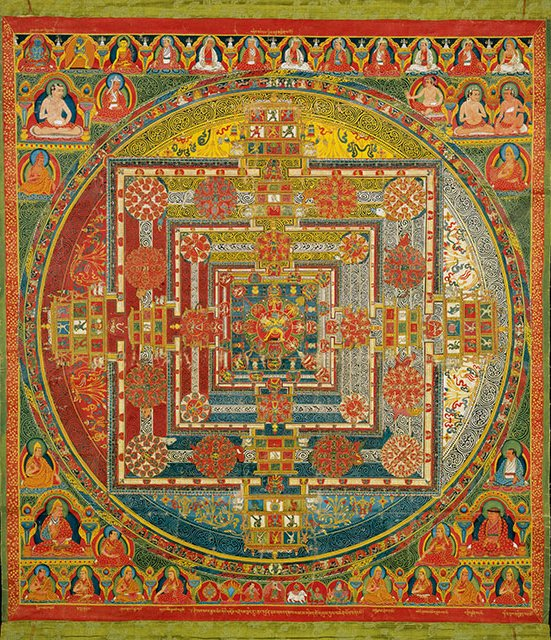
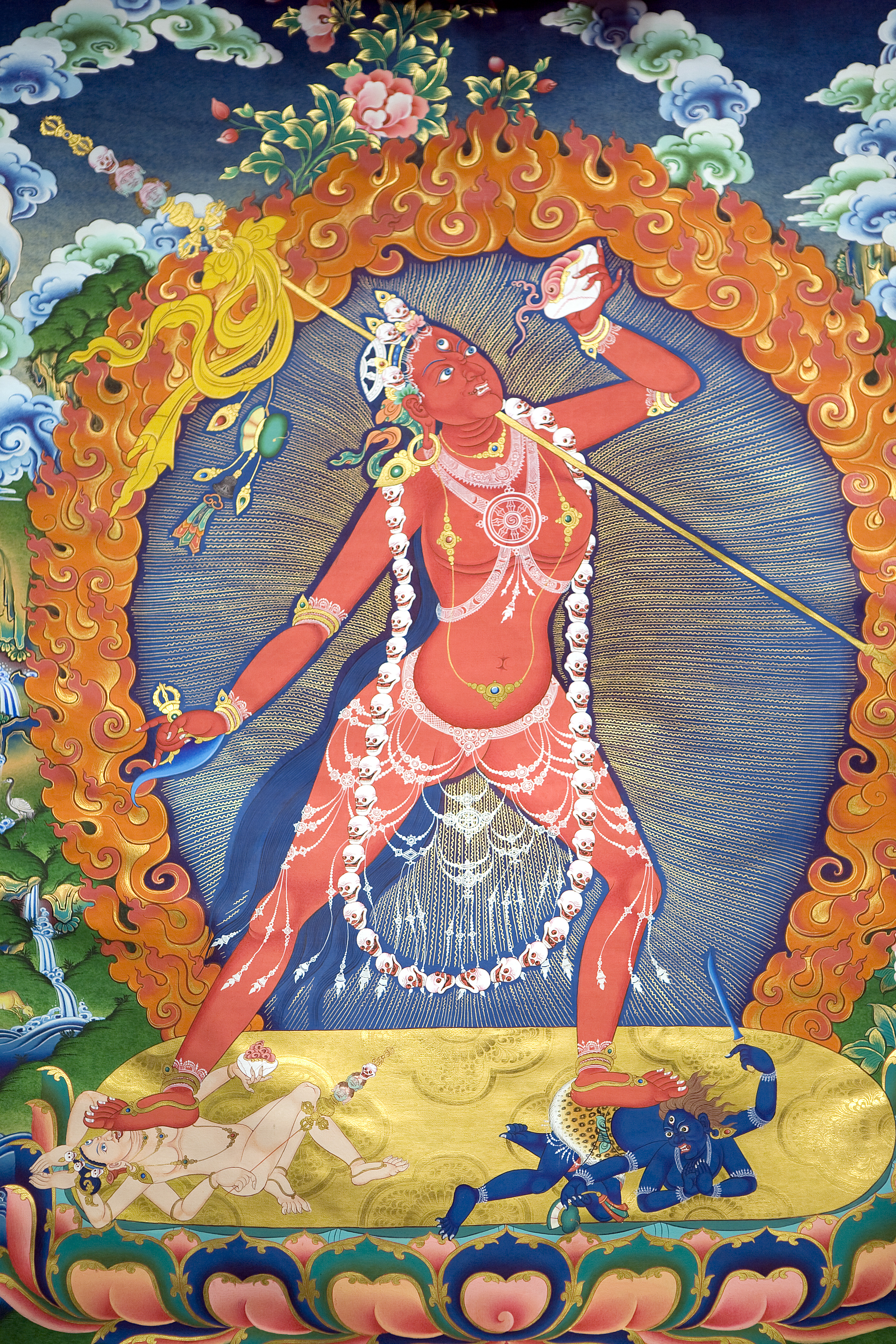
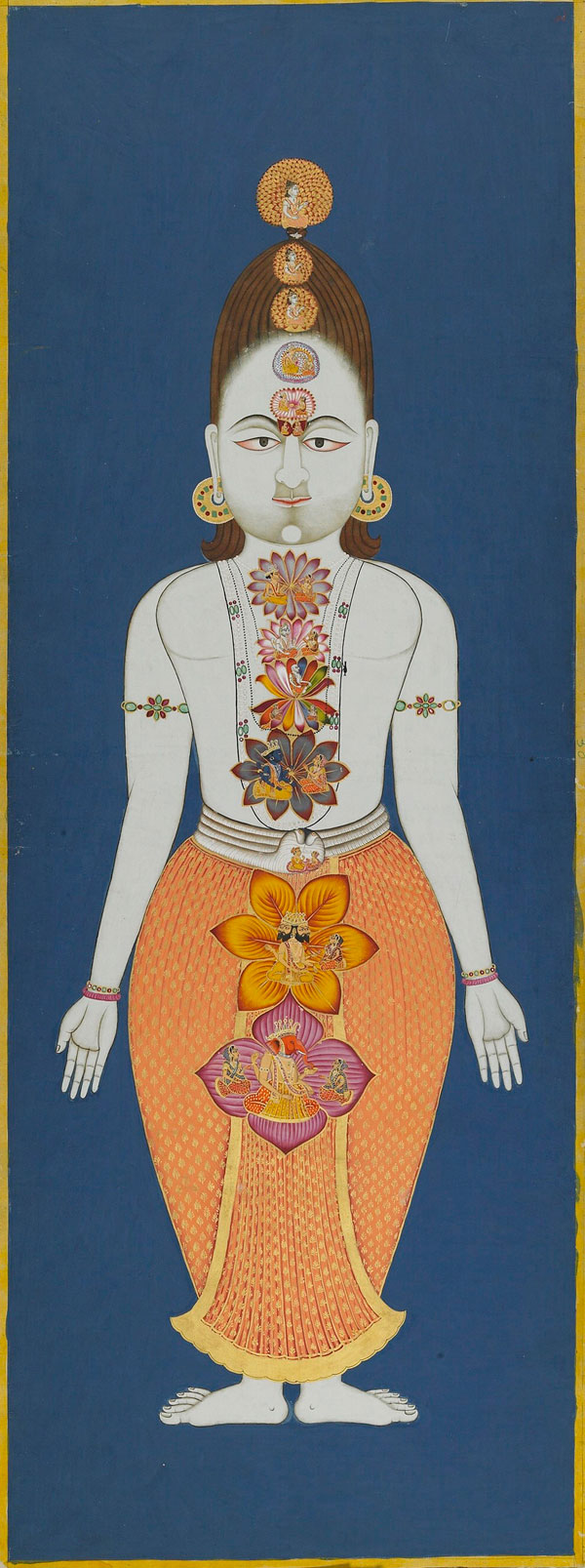
Tantric art. Clockwise from upper left: Sri Yantra, Kalachakra Mandala, Shaiva Nath chakra, and Vajrayogini.

Tantra (/ˈtʌntrə/; Sanskrit: तन्त्र, lit. 'loom') is an esoteric yogic tradition. It was developed in the Indian subcontinent, beginning in the middle of the 1st millennium CE; initially within Shaivism and Shaktism practices, and subsequently in Buddhism and Vaishnavism.

Tantra presents complex cosmologies, viewing the body as divine and typically reflecting the union of Shiva and Shakti. Tantric goals include siddhi (supernatural accomplishment), bhoga (pleasure), and kundalini ascent; while also addressing states of possession (āveśa) and exorcism.

The term tantra in the Indian traditions also refers to a set of texts describing systems, methods, instruments, techniques and practices. The tantras focus on sādhanā, encompassing dīkṣā, rituals and yoga. A key feature of tantric traditions is the use of mantras, thus they are commonly referred to as Mantramārga ('Path of Mantra') in Hinduism, Mantrayāna ('Mantra Vehicle') in Mahayana Buddhism.

In Buddhism, the Vajrayana traditions focuses on tantric ideas and practices, which are based on Indian Buddhist Tantras. They include Indo-Tibetan Buddhism, Chinese Esoteric Buddhism, Japanese Shingon Buddhism and Nepalese Newar Buddhism. Although Southern Esoteric Buddhism does not directly reference the tantras, its practices and ideas parallel them.

Tantric Hindu and Buddhist traditions have also influenced other Eastern religious traditions such as Jainism, the Tibetan Bön tradition, Taoism, and the Japanese Shintō tradition.

Though Western views often equate Tantra with sex, scholars emphasize that sexual practices in tantric traditions are rare, highly restricted to initiated adepts, and serve as a means of spiritual transcendence rather than an end in themselves.

== Etymology ==
Tantra (Sanskrit: तन्त्र) literally means "loom, warp, weave". According to Padoux, the verbal root Tan means: "to extend", "to spread", "to spin out", "weave", "display", "put forth", and "compose". Therefore, by extension, it can also mean "system", "doctrine", or "work".

The connotation of the word tantra to mean an esoteric practice or religious ritualism is a colonial era European invention. This term is based on the metaphor of weaving, states Ron Barrett, where the Sanskrit root tan means the warping of threads on a loom. It implies "interweaving of traditions and teachings as threads" into a text, technique or practice.

The word appears in the hymns of the Rigveda such as in 10.71, with the meaning of "warp (weaving)". It is found in many other Vedic era texts, such as in section 10.7.42 of the Atharvaveda and many Brahmanas. In these and post-Vedic texts, the contextual meaning of Tantra is that which is "principal or essential part, main point, model, framework, feature". In the Smritis and epics of Hinduism (and Jainism), the term means "doctrine, rule, theory, method, technique or chapter" and the word appears both as a separate word and as a common suffix, such as atma-tantra meaning "doctrine or theory of Atman (Self)".

The term "Tantra" after about 500 BCE, in Buddhism, Hinduism and Jainism is a bibliographic category, just like the word Sutra (which means "sewing together", mirroring the metaphor of "weaving together" in Tantra). The same Buddhist texts are sometimes referred to as tantra or sutra; for example, Vairocabhisambodhi-tantra is also referred to as Vairocabhisambodhi-sutra. The various contextual meanings of the word Tantra vary with the Indian text and are summarized in the appended table.

Appearance of the term "Tantra" in Indian texts
Period (Note: The dates in the left column of the table are estimates and contested by scholars.)	Text or author	Contextual meaning of tantra
1500–1100 BCE	Ṛigveda X, 71.9	Loom (or weaving device)
1200–1000 BCE	Sāmaveda, Tandya Brahmana	Essence (or "main part", perhaps denoting the quintessence of the Śāstras)
1200–900 BCE	Atharvaveda X, 7.42	Loom (or weaving)
1200–800 BCE	Yajurveda, Taittiriya Brahmana 11.5.5.3	Loom (or weaving)
800-600 BCE	Śatapatha Brāhmaṇa	Essence (or main part; see above)
600–500 BCE	Pāṇini in Aṣṭādhyāyī 1.4.54 and 5.2.70	Warp (weaving), loom
350–283 BCE	Chanakya on Arthaśāstra	Science; system or shastra
300 CE	Īśvarakṛṣṇa author of Sānkhya Kārikā (kārikā 70)	Doctrine (identifies Sankhya as a tantra)
320 CE	Viṣṇu Purāṇa	Practices and rituals
320–400 CE	Poet Kālidāsa on Abhijñānaśākuntalam	Deep understanding or mastery of a topic (Note: Banerjee (1988): "Tantra is sometimes used to denote governance. Kālidāsa uses the expression prajah tantrayitva (having governed the subjects) in the Abhijñānaśākuntalam (V.5).")
423	Gangdhar stone inscription in Rajasthan	Worship techniques (Tantrodbhuta) Dubious link to Tantric practices.
500	Hindu Agamas	A set of esoteric doctrines and practices, featuring archaic prosody and linguistic evidence dating back to 500 BCE. Tantra here implies "Extensive knowledge of principles of reality".
550	Sabarasvamin's commentary on Mimamsa Sutra 11.1.1, 11.4.1 etc.	Thread, text; beneficial action or thing
606–647	Sanskrit scholar and poet Bāṇabhaṭṭa (in Harṣacarita (Note: Banerjee (2002), p. 34: "Banabhatta, the Sanskrit author of the 7th century, refers, in the Harshacharita to the propitiation of Matrikas by a tantric ascetic.") and in Kādambari), in Bhāsa's Cārudatta and in Śūdraka's Mṛcchakatika	Set of sites and worship methods to goddesses or Matrikas.
650	Vairocanābhisaṃbodhi Sūtra	The first evidence of Buddhist esoteric doctrines or practices, known as Vajrayāna and sometimes also as Tantrayāna.
post-650	Buddhist tantric literature	Various Vajrayāna esoteric doctrines or practices.
975–1025	Philosopher Abhinavagupta in his Tantrāloka	Set of doctrines or practices, teachings, texts, system (synthesis of the 64 monistic āgamas and based on Kashmir Shaivism)
1150–1200	Jayaratha, Abhinavagupta's commentator on Tantrāloka	Set of doctrines or practices, teachings
1690–1785	Bhaskararaya (philosopher)	System of thought or set of doctrines or practices, a canon

== Definition ==
=== Ancient and medieval era ===
The 5th-century BCE scholar Pāṇini in his Sutra 1.4.54–55 of Sanskrit grammar, cryptically explains tantra through the example of "Sva-tantra" (Sanskrit: स्वतन्त्र), which he states means "independent" or a person who is his own "warp, cloth, weaver, promoter, karta (actor)".

Patanjali in his Mahābhāṣya quotes and accepts Panini's definition, then discusses or mentions it at a greater length, stating that its metaphorical definition of "warp (weaving), extended cloth" is relevant to many contexts. The word tantra, states Patanjali, means "principal, main".

He uses the same example of svatantra as a composite word of "sva" (self) and tantra, then stating "svatantra" means "one who is self-dependent, one who is his own master, the principal thing for whom is himself", thereby interpreting the definition of tantra. Patanjali also offers a semantic definition of Tantra, stating that it is structural rules, standard procedures, centralized guide or knowledge in any field that applies to many elements.

The ancient Mimamsa school of Hinduism uses the term tantra extensively, and its scholars offer various definitions. For example:

When an action or a thing, once complete, becomes beneficial in several matters to one person, or to many people, that is known as Tantra. For example, a lamp placed amidst many priests. In contrast, that which benefits by its repetition is called Āvāpa, such as massaging with oil. (...)

— Sabara, 6th century,

Medieval texts present their own definitions of Tantra. Kāmikā-tantra, for example, gives the following explanation of the term tantra:

Because it elaborates (tan) copious and profound matters, especially relating to the principles of reality (tattva) and sacred mantras, and because it provides liberation (tra), it is called a tantra.

=== Modern era ===
Many definitions of Tantra have been proposed, and there is no universally accepted definition. Tantric traditions have been studied mostly from textual and historical perspectives. Anthropological work on living Tantric tradition is scarce, and ethnography has rarely engaged with the study of Tantra. This is arguably a result of the modern construction of Tantrism as occult, esoteric and secret. Some scholars have tried to demystify the myth of secrecy in contemporary Tantric traditions, suggesting new methodological avenues to overcome the ethical and epistemological problems in the study of living Tantric traditions.

André Padoux, in his review of Tantra definitions offers two, then rejects both. One definition, according to Padoux, is found among Tantra practitioners – it is any "system of observances" about the vision of man and the cosmos where correspondences between the inner world of the person and the macrocosmic reality play an essential role. Another definition, more common among observers and non-practitioners, is some "set of mechanistic rituals, omitting entirely the ideological side".

According to David N. Lorenzen, two different kinds of definitions of Tantra exist, narrow and broad. According to the narrow definition, Tantrism, or "Tantric religion", is the elite traditions directly based on the Sanskrit texts called the Tantras, Samhitas, and Agamas. Lorenzen's "broad definition" extends this by including a broad range of "magical beliefs and practices" such as Yoga and Shaktism.

Richard Payne states that Tantra has been commonly but incorrectly associated with sex, given popular culture's prurient obsession with intimacy. Tantra has been labelled as the "yoga of ecstasy", driven by senseless ritualistic libertinism. This is far from the diverse and complex understanding of what Tantra means to those Buddhists, Hindu and Jains who practice it.

David Gray disagrees with broad generalizations and states that defining Tantra is a difficult task because "Tantra traditions are manifold, spanning several religious traditions and cultural worlds. As a result they are also diverse, which makes it a significant challenge to come up with an adequate definition". The challenge of defining Tantra is compounded by the fact that it has been a historically significant part of major Indian religions, including Buddhism, Hinduism and Jainism, both in and outside South Asia and East Asia. To its practitioners, Tantra is defined as a combination of texts, techniques, rituals, monastic practices, meditation, yoga, and ideology.

According to Georg Feuerstein,

The scope of topics discussed in the Tantras is considerable. They deal with the creation and history of the world; the names and functions of a great variety of male and female deities and other higher beings; the types of ritual worship (especially of Goddesses); magic, sorcery, and divination; esoteric "physiology" (the mapping of the subtle or psychic body); the awakening of the mysterious serpent power (kundalinî-shakti); techniques of bodily and mental purification; the nature of enlightenment; and not least, sacred sexuality.

Hindu puja, temples and iconography all show tantric influence. (Note: Padoux (2013), p. 2: "The Hindu worship, the pūjā, for instance, is Tantric in its conception and ritual process, the principles of Hindu temple building and iconography are Tantric, and so on.") These texts, states Gavin Flood, contain representation of "the body in philosophy, in ritual and in art", which are linked to "techniques of the body, methods or technologies developed within the tantric traditions intended to transform body and self".

==== Tantrism ====
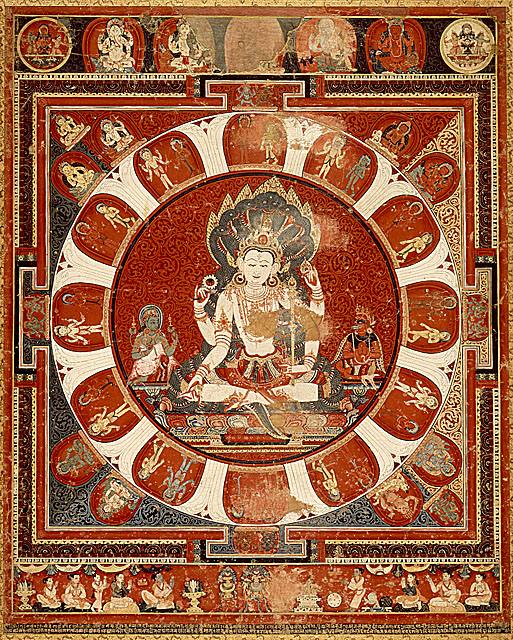
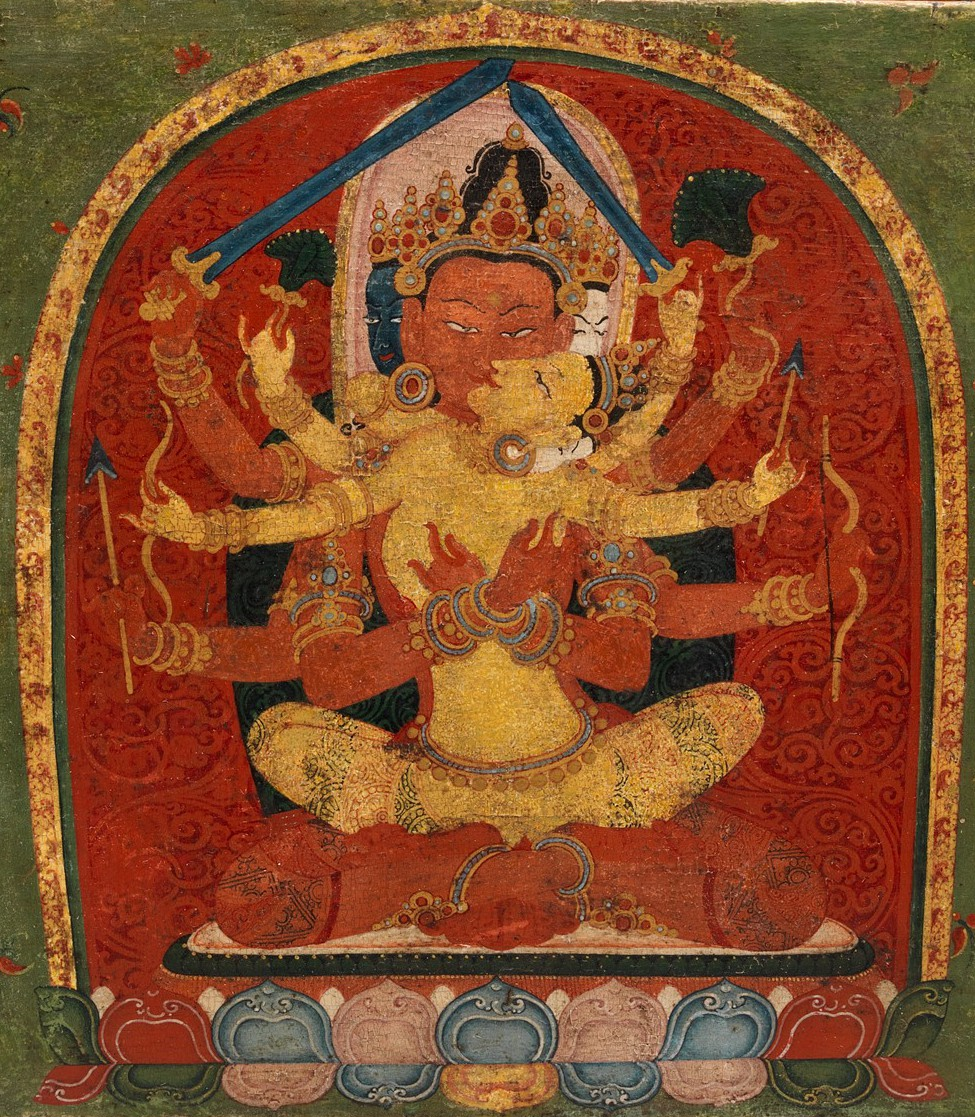
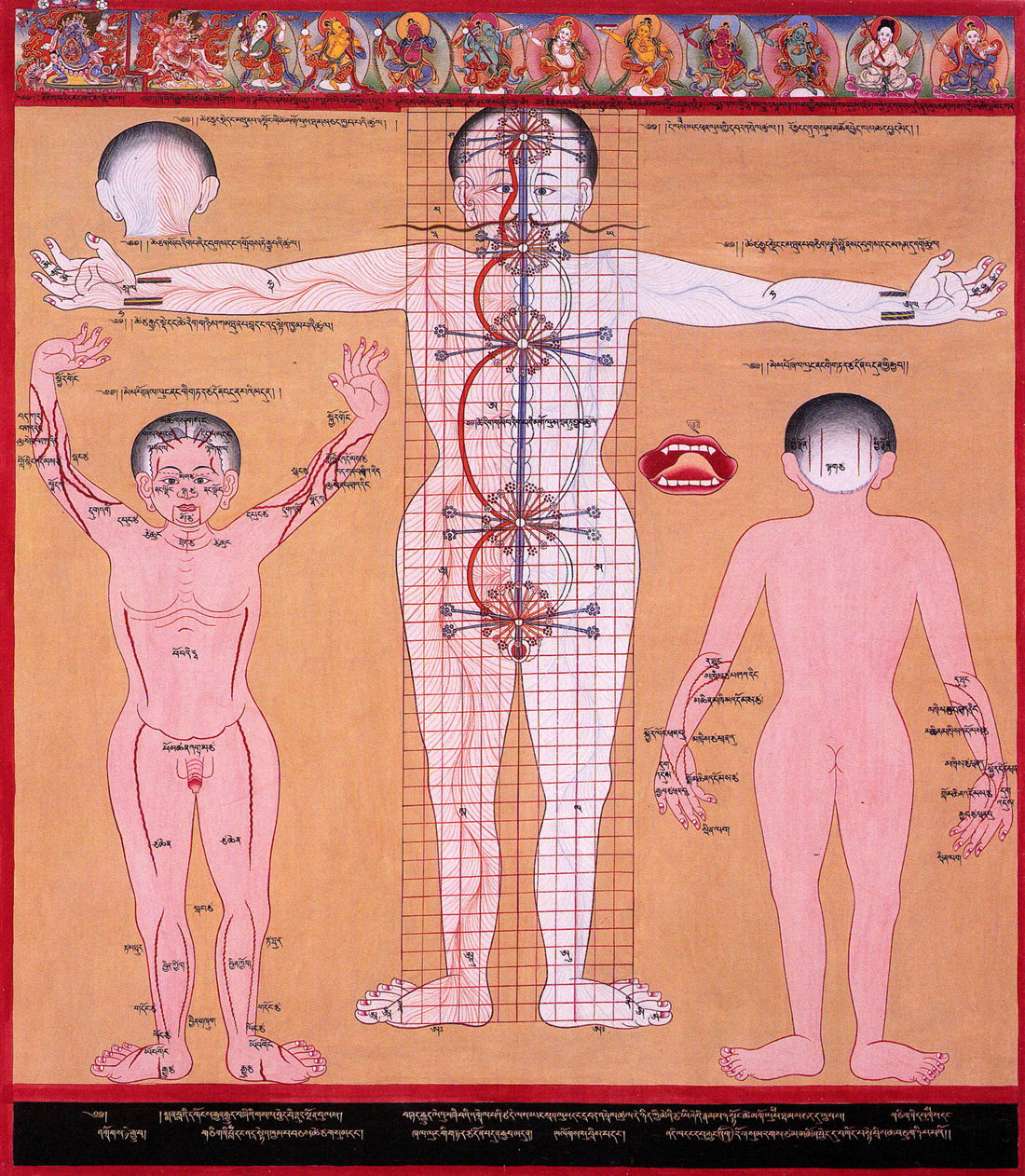
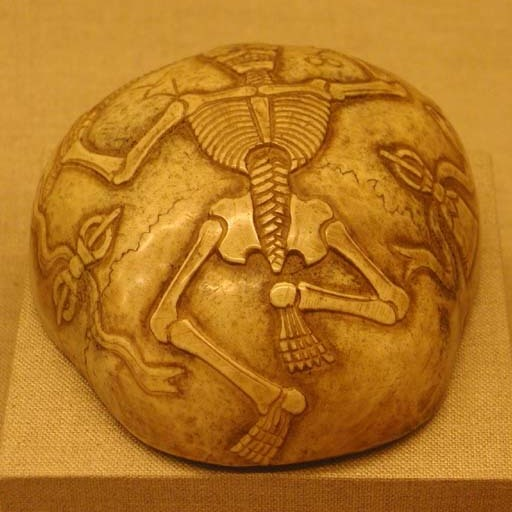
Elements of Tantrism. Clockwise from upper left: Mantra (Buddhist), Mandala (Hindu), Yantra (of Kali), Skull cup (Kapala), Nadis and Chakras (Tibetan), Deities depicted in sexual union. These are neither compulsory nor universal in Tantrism.

The term tantrism is a 19th-century European invention not present in any Asian language; compare "Sufism", of similar Orientalist origin. According to Padoux, Tantrism is a Western term and notion, not a category that is used by Tantrikas themselves. The term was introduced by 19th-century Indologists, with limited knowledge of India and in whose view Tantrism was a particular, unusual and minority practice in contrast to Indian traditions they believed to be mainstream.

Robert Brown similarly notes that "tantrism" is a construct of Western scholarship, not a concept of the religious system itself. He defines Tantrism as an apologetic label of Westerners for a system that they little understand that is "not coherent" and which is "an accumulated set of practices and ideas from various sources, that has varied between its practitioners within a group, varied across groups, across geography and over its history". It is a system, adds Brown, that gives each follower the freedom to mix Tantric elements with non-Tantric aspects, to challenge and transgress any and all norms, experiment with "the mundane to reach the supramundane".

Teun Goudriaan in his 1981 review of Hindu Tantrism, states that Tantrism usually means a "systematic quest for salvation or spiritual excellence" by realizing and fostering the divine within one's own body, one that is simultaneous union of the masculine-feminine and spirit-matter, and has the ultimate goal of realizing the "primal blissful state of non-duality". It is typically a methodically striven system, consisting of voluntarily chosen specific practices which may include Tantric items such as mantras (bijas), geometric patterns and symbols (mandala), gestures (mudra), mapping of the microcosm within one's body to the macrocosmic elements outside as the subtle body (kundalini yoga), assignments of icons and sounds (nyasa), meditation (dhyana), ritual worship (puja), initiation (diksha) and others. Tantrism, adds Goudriaan, is a living system that is decidedly monistic, but with wide variations, and it is impossible to be dogmatic about a simple or fixed definition.

Tantrism is an overarching term for "Tantric traditions", states David Gray in a 2016 review, that combine Vedic, yogic and meditative traditions from 5th-century Hinduism as well as rival Buddhist and Jain traditions. It is a neologism of western scholars and does not reflect the self-understanding of any particular tantric tradition. While Goudriaan's description is useful, adds Gray, there is no single defining universal characteristic common to all Tantra traditions, being an open evolving system. Tantrism, whether Buddhist or Hindu, can best be characterized as practices, a set of techniques, with a strong focus on rituals and meditation, by those who believe that it is a path to liberation that is characterized by both knowledge and freedom.

==== Tantrika ====
According to Padoux, the term "Tantrika" is based on a comment by Kulluka Bhatta on Manava Dharmasastra 2.1, who contrasted vaidika and tantrika forms of Śruti (canonical texts). The Tantrika, to Bhatta, is that literature which forms a parallel part of the Hindu tradition, independent of the Vedic corpus. The Vedic and non-Vedic (Tantric) paths are seen as two different approaches to ultimate reality, the Vedic approach based on Brahman, and Tantrika being based on the non-Vedic Āgama texts. Despite Bhatta attempt to clarify, states Padoux, in reality Hindus and Buddhists have historically felt free to borrow and blend ideas from all sources, Vedic, non-Vedic and in the case of Buddhism, its own canonical works.

One of the key differences between the Tantric and non-Tantric traditions – whether it be orthodox Buddhism, Hinduism or Jainism – is their assumptions about the need for monastic or ascetic life. Non-Tantrika, or orthodox traditions in all three major ancient Indian religions, hold that the worldly life of a householder is one driven by desires and greeds which are a serious impediment to spiritual liberation (moksha, nirvana, kaivalya). These orthodox traditions teach renunciation of householder life, a mendicant's life of simplicity and leaving all attachments to become a monk or nun. In contrast, the Tantrika traditions hold, states Robert Brown, that "both enlightenment and worldly success" are achievable, and that "this world need not be shunned to achieve enlightenment". Yet, even this supposed categorical divergence is debatable, e.g. Bhagavad Gita v.2:48–53, including: "Yoga is skill in [the performance of] actions."

== Features ==
The Tantras emphasize spiritual practice or sādhana, including initiation (dīkṣā), rituals, and yoga. A standard ritual framework is present in the Tantras, despite variations in deities and mantras, involving body purification through symbolic dissolution, creation of a divine body or self via mantra, internal worship or dhyāna (visualization), and external worship or pūjā, utilizing hand gestures (mudrā), mantra chanting, and sacred diagrams (yantra, maṇḍala).

The Tantras feature complex cosmological hierarchies that incorporate earlier traditions' cosmic structures, with the highest Śaiva Siddhānta realm surpassed by additional realms in Kashmir Śaiva traditions. The body is seen as divine, containing the cosmic order, reflecting the polarity of the male deity and his consort, the feminine energy, often Shiva and his Shakti as Goddess Kuṇḍalinī, with their union symbolizing liberation. The Tantras focus on attaining mystical powers (siddhi) and experiencing bliss in higher realms (bhoga) as part of the practitioner’s spiritual journey, also interpreted as the movement of Kuṇḍalinī through the body. The Tantras address possession (āveśa) and the practice of exorcism.

Tantric practitioners do not deny the use of sexual rituals to gain powers, but emphasize the disciplined relationship between guru and disciple.

== History ==
=== Proto-tantric elements in Indian religions ===
While Tantra arose in the 5th century CE in Shaivite religions, practices and ideas can be found in Indian religion and history which may have been formative to Tantric practices and ideas.

==== Proto-tantric elements in Vedic religion ====
===== Rig Veda =====
The Keśin hymn of the Rig Veda (10.136) describes the "wild loner" who, states Karel Werner, "carrying within oneself fire and poison, heaven and earth, ranging from enthusiasm and creativity to depression and agony, from the heights of spiritual bliss to the heaviness of earth-bound labor". The Rigveda uses words of admiration for these loners, and whether it is related to Tantra or not, has been variously interpreted.

According to David Lorenzen, it describes munis (sages) experiencing Tantra-like "ecstatic, altered states of consciousness" and gaining the ability "to fly on the wind". In contrast, Werner suggests that these are early Yoga pioneers and accomplished yogis of the ancient pre-Buddhist Indian tradition, and that this Vedic hymn is speaking of those "lost in thoughts" whose "personalities are not bound to earth, for they follow the path of the mysterious wind". However, Patrick Olivelle suggests that in the early Vedic-Brahmanical texts, some of which predate the 3rd-century BCE ruler Ashoka, Brahmana and Śramaṇa (ascetics) were neither distinct nor opposed. The later distinctions were semantic developments possibly influenced by the appropriation of the term Śramaṇa by Buddhism and Jainism.

===== Upanishads =====
The two oldest Upanishads of Hinduism, the Brihadaranyaka Upanishad in section 4.2 and Chandogya Upanishad in section 8.6, refer to nadis (hati) in presenting their theory on how the Atman (Self) and the body are connected and interdependent through energy carrying arteries when one is awake or sleeping, but they do not mention anything related to Tantric practices. Likewise, the Taittiriya Upanishad discusses a central channel running through the body and various Vedic texts mention the bodily pranas (vital breaths) that move around in the body and animate it. However, the idea of consciously moving the bodily pranas through yoga is not found in these sources.

According to Lorenzen, Vedic ideas related to the body later diversified into the "mystical anatomy" of nadis and chakras found in Tantra. The yogic component of Tantrism appears clearly in Bāṇabhaṭṭa's Harshacharita and Daṇḍin's Dashakumaracharita.In contrast to this theory of Lorenzen, other scholars such as Mircea Eliade consider Yoga and the evolution of Yogic practices to be separate and distinct from the evolution of Tantra and Tantric practices.

According to Geoffrey Samuel, the inner development of a spiritual energy called tapas becomes a central element of Vedic religion in the Brahmanas and Srauta texts. In these texts, ascetic practices allow a holy man to build up tapas, a kind of magical inner heat, which allows them to perform all sorts of magical feats as well as granting visions and divine revelations. Samuel also notes that in the Mahabharata, one of the commonest use of the term "yoga" refers to "a dying warrior transferring himself at death to the sphere of the sun through yoga, a practice that links up with Upanisadic references to the channel to the crown of the head as the pathway by which one can travel through the solar orb to the World of Brahman." This practice of transferring one's consciousness at death is still an important practice in Tibetan Buddhism. Samuel also notes that sexual rituals and a spiritualized sexuality are mentioned in the late Upanishads. According to Samuel, "late Vedic texts treat sexual intercourse as symbolically equivalent to the Vedic sacrifice, and ejaculation of semen as the offering." This theme can be found in the Jaiminiya Brahmana, the Chandogya Upanisad, and the Brhadaranyaka Upanisad. The Brhadaranyaka contains various sexual rituals and practices which are mostly aimed at obtaining a child which are concerned with the loss of male virility and power.

===== Yogini cults =====
David Gordon White views Yogini cults as foundational to early tantra but disagrees with scholars who maintain that the roots of such cults lie in an "autochthonous non-Vedic source" such as indigenous tribes or the Indus Valley civilization. Instead, White suggests that Vedic Srauta texts mention offerings to goddesses Rākā, Sinīvālī, and Kuhū in a manner similar to a tantric ritual.

===== Atharvaveda =====
Frederick Smith – a professor of Sanskrit and Classical Indian Religions – considers Tantra to be a religious movement parallel to the Bhakti movement of the 1st millennium CE. Tantra along with Ayurveda, states Smith, has traditionally been attributed to Atharvaveda, but this attribution is one of respect not of historicity. Ayurveda has primarily been an empirical practice with Vedic roots, but Tantra has been an esoteric, folk movement without grounding that cannot be traced to anything in Atharvaveda or any other Vedic text.

==== Proto-Tantric elements in Buddhism ====
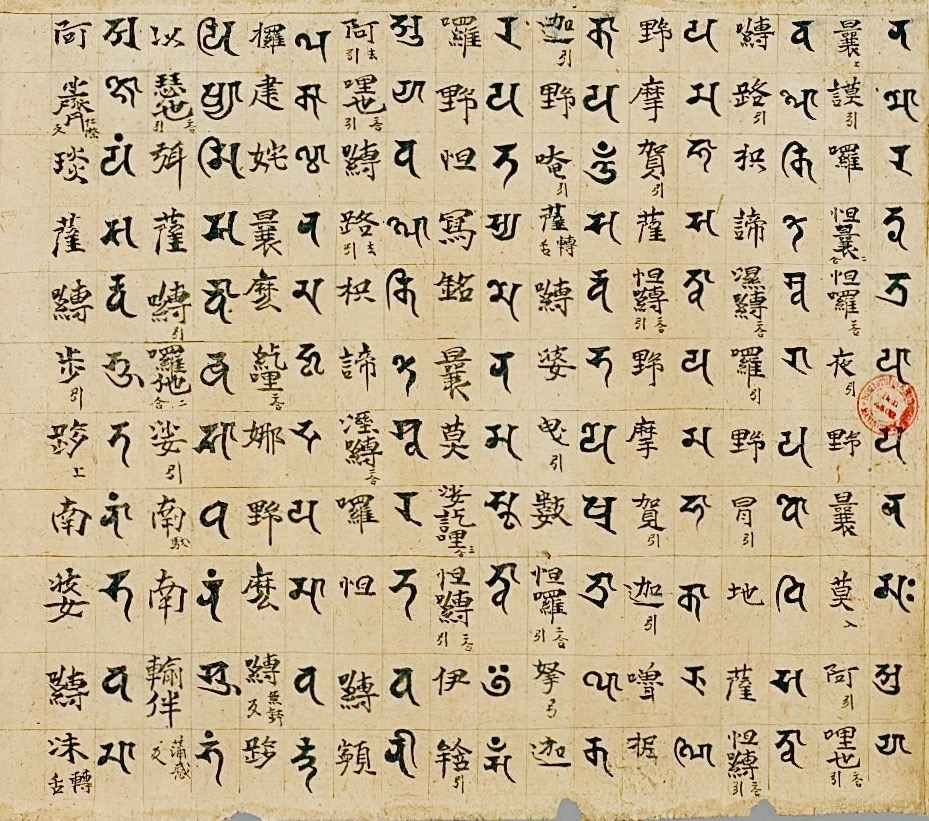
A Buddhist dhāraṇī (incantation), the Nilaṇṭhanāmahṛdaya dhāraṇī, in Siddham Script with Chinese transliteration

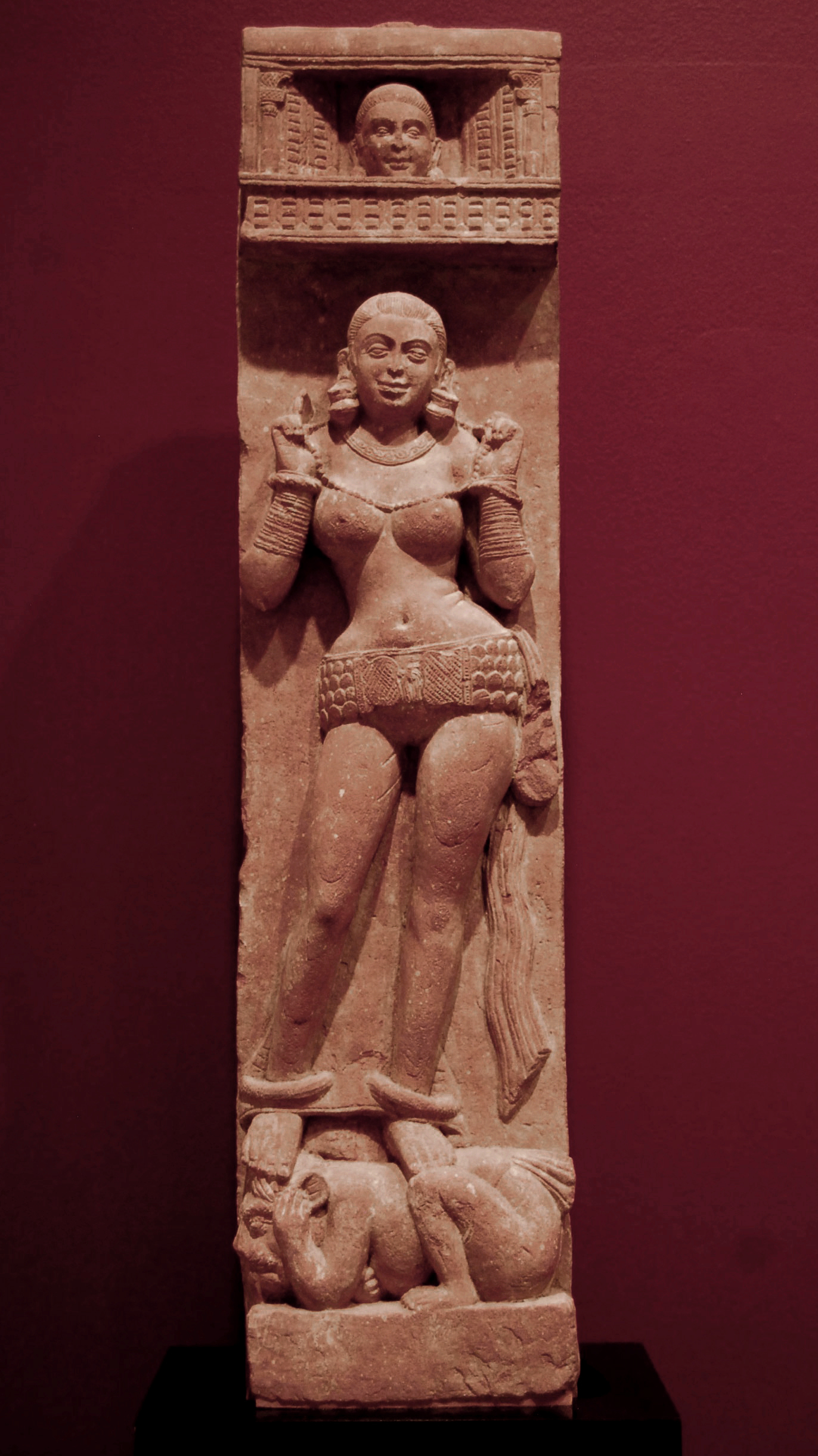
Kushan sculpture of a yakṣiṇī (2nd century), Mathura region

Pre-tantric Buddhism contains elements which could be seen as proto-tantric, and which may have influenced the development of the Buddhist Tantric tradition. The use of magical chants or incantations can be found in the early Buddhist texts as well as in some Mahayana sutras. These magical spells or chants were used for various reasons, such as for protection, and for the generation of auspiciousness. Mahayana incantations are called dhāraṇīs. Some Mahayana sutras incorporate the use of mantras, a central feature of tantric practice.

According to Geoffrey Samuel, sramana groups like the Buddhists and Jains were associated with the dead. Samuel notes that they "frequently settled at sites associated with the dead and seem to have taken over a significant role in relation to the spirits of the dead." To step into this realm required entering a dangerous and impure supernatural realm from the Indian perspective. This association with death remains a feature of modern Buddhism, and in Buddhist countries today, Buddhist monks and other ritual specialists are in charge of the dead. Thus, the association of tantric practitioners with charnel grounds and death imagery is preceded by early Buddhist contact with these sites of the dead.

Some scholars think that the development of tantra may have been influenced by the cults of nature spirit-deities like Yakṣas and Nagas. Yakṣa cults were an important part of early Buddhism. Yakṣas are powerful nature spirits which were sometimes seen as guardians or protectors. Yakṣas like Kubera are also associated with magical incantations. Kubera is said to have provided the Buddhist sangha with protection spells in the Āṭānāṭiya Sutta. These spirit deities also included numerous female deities (yakṣiṇī) that can be found depicted in major Buddhist sites like Sanchi and Bharhut. In early Buddhist texts there is also mention of fierce demon-like deities called rākṣasa and rākṣasī, like the children-eating Hārītī. They are also present in Mahayana texts, such as in Chapter 26 of the Lotus Sutra, which includes a dialogue between the Buddha and a group of rākṣasīs, who swear to uphold and protect the sutra. These figures also teach magical dhāraṇīs to protect followers of the Lotus Sutra.

A key element of Buddhist Tantric practice is the visualization of deities in meditation. This practice is actually found in pre-tantric Buddhist texts as well, and in Mahayana sutras like the Pratyutpanna Samādhi and the three Amitabha Pure land sutras. There are other Mahāyāna sutras which contain what may be called "proto-tantric" material, such as the Gandavyuha and the Dasabhumika, which might have served as a source for the imagery found in later Tantric texts. According to Samuel, the Golden Light Sutra (c. 5th century at the latest) contains what could be seen as a proto-mandala. In the second chapter, a bodhisattva has a vision of "a vast building made of beryl and with divine jewels and celestial perfumes. Four lotus-seats appear in the four directions, with four Buddhas seated upon them: Aksobhya in the East, Ratnaketu in the South, Amitayus in the West and Dundubhīśvara in the North."

A series of artwork discovered in Gandhara, in modern-day Pakistan, dating from about the 1st century CE, show Buddhist and Hindu monks holding skulls. The legend corresponding to these artworks is found in Buddhist texts, and describes monks "who tap skulls and forecast the future rebirths of the person to whom that skull belonged". According to Robert Brown, these Buddhist skull-tapping reliefs suggest that tantric practices may have been in vogue by the 1st century CE.

==== Proto-Tantric elements in Shaktism and Shaivism ====
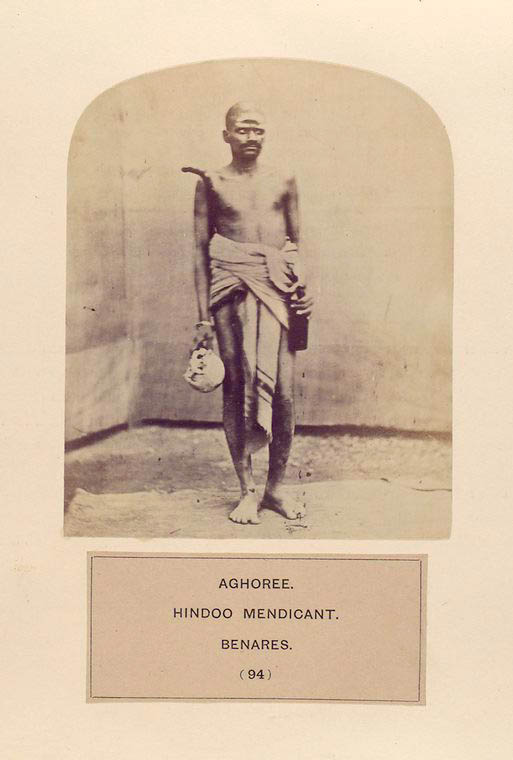
A modern aghori with a skull-cup (Kapala). Their predecessors, the medieval Kapalikas ("Skull-men") were influential figures in the development of transgressive or "left hand" Shaiva tantra.

The Mahabharata, the Harivamsa, and the Devi Mahatmya in the Markandeya Purana all mention the fierce, demon-killing manifestations of the Great Goddess, Mahishamardini, identified with Durga-Parvati. These suggest that Shaktism, reverence and worship for the Goddess in Indian culture, was an established tradition by the early centuries of the 1st millennium. Padoux mentions an inscription from 423 to 424 CE which mentions the founding of a temple to terrifying deities called "the mothers". However, this does not mean Tantric rituals and practices were as yet a part of either Hindu or Buddhist traditions. "Apart from the somewhat dubious reference to Tantra in the Gangadhar inscription of 423 CE", states David Lorenzen, it is only 7th-century Banabhatta's Kadambari which provide convincing proof of Tantra and Tantric texts.

Shaivite ascetics seem to have been involved in the initial development of Tantra, particularly the transgressive elements dealing with the charnel ground. According to Samuel, one group of Shaiva ascetics, the Pasupatas, practiced a form of spirituality that made use of shocking and disreputable behavior later found in a tantric context, such as dancing, singing, and smearing themselves with ashes.

Early Tantric practices are sometimes attributed to Shaiva ascetics associated with Bhairava, the Kapalikas ("skull men", also called Somasiddhatins or Mahavartins). Besides the shocking fact that they frequented cremation grounds and carried human skulls, little is known about them, and there is a paucity of primary sources on the Kapalikas. Samuel also states that the sources depict them as using alcohol and sex freely, that they were associated with terrifying female spirit-deities called yoginis and dakinis, and that they were believed to possess magical powers, such as flight.

Kapalikas are depicted in fictional works and also widely disparaged in Buddhist, Hindu and Jain texts of the 1st millennium CE. In Hāla's Gatha-saptasati (composed by the 5th century AD), for example, the story calls a female character Kapalika, whose lover dies, he is cremated, she takes his cremation ashes and smears her body with it. The 6th-century Varāhamihira mentions Kapalikas in his literary works. Some of the Kāpālika practices mentioned in these texts are those found in Shaiva Hinduism and Vajrayana Buddhism, and scholars disagree on who influenced whom.

These early historical mentions are in passing and appear to be Tantra-like practices, they are not detailed nor comprehensive presentation of Tantric beliefs and practices. Epigraphic references to the Kaulas Tantric practices are rare. Reference is made in the early 9th century to vama (left-hand) Tantras of the Kaulas. Literary evidence suggests Tantric Buddhism was probably flourishing by the 7th century. Matrikas, or fierce mother goddesses that later are closely linked to Tantra practices, appear both in Buddhist and Hindu arts and literature between the 7th and 10th centuries.

=== Rise and development ===
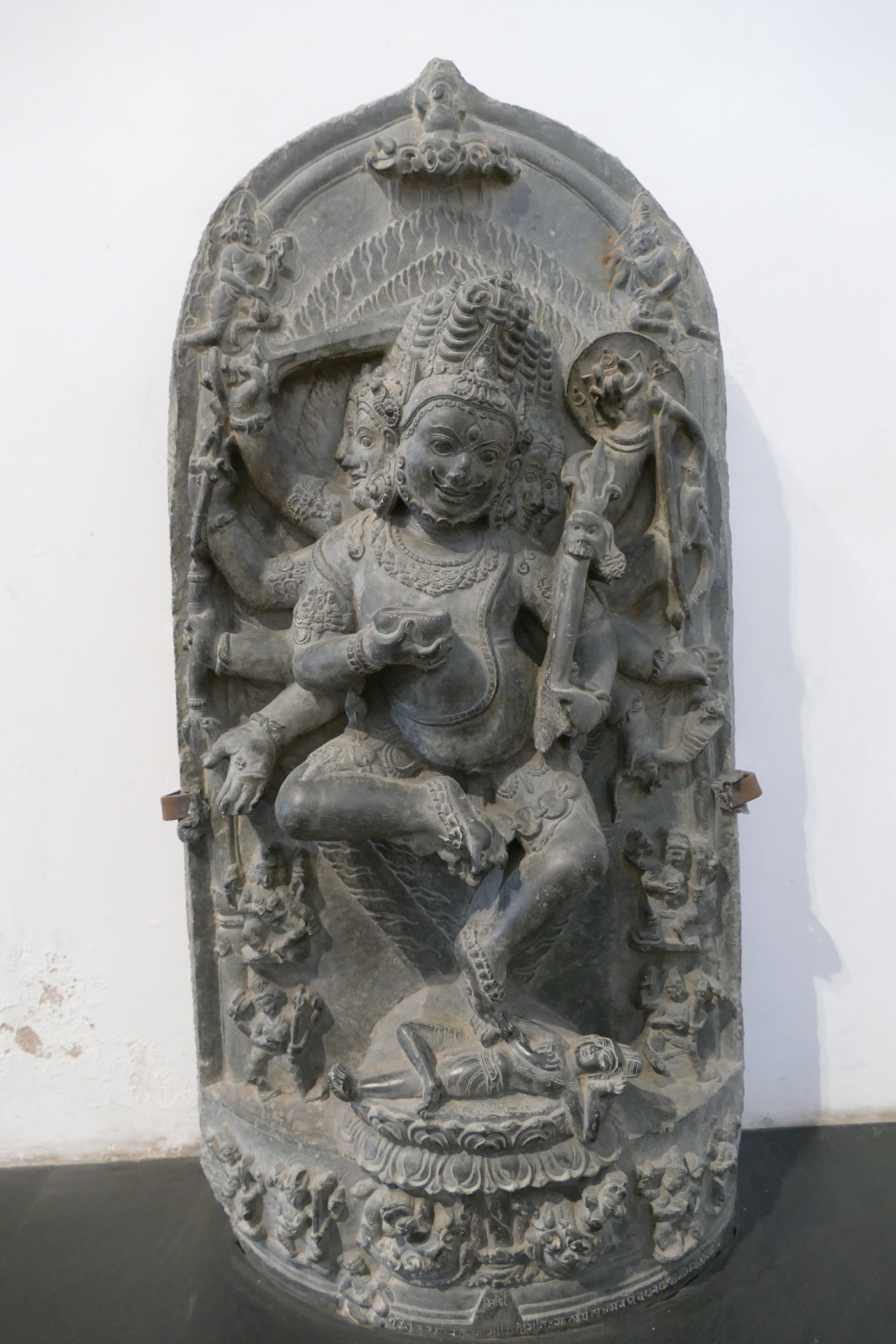
Dancing Bhairava in the Indian Museum, Kolkata

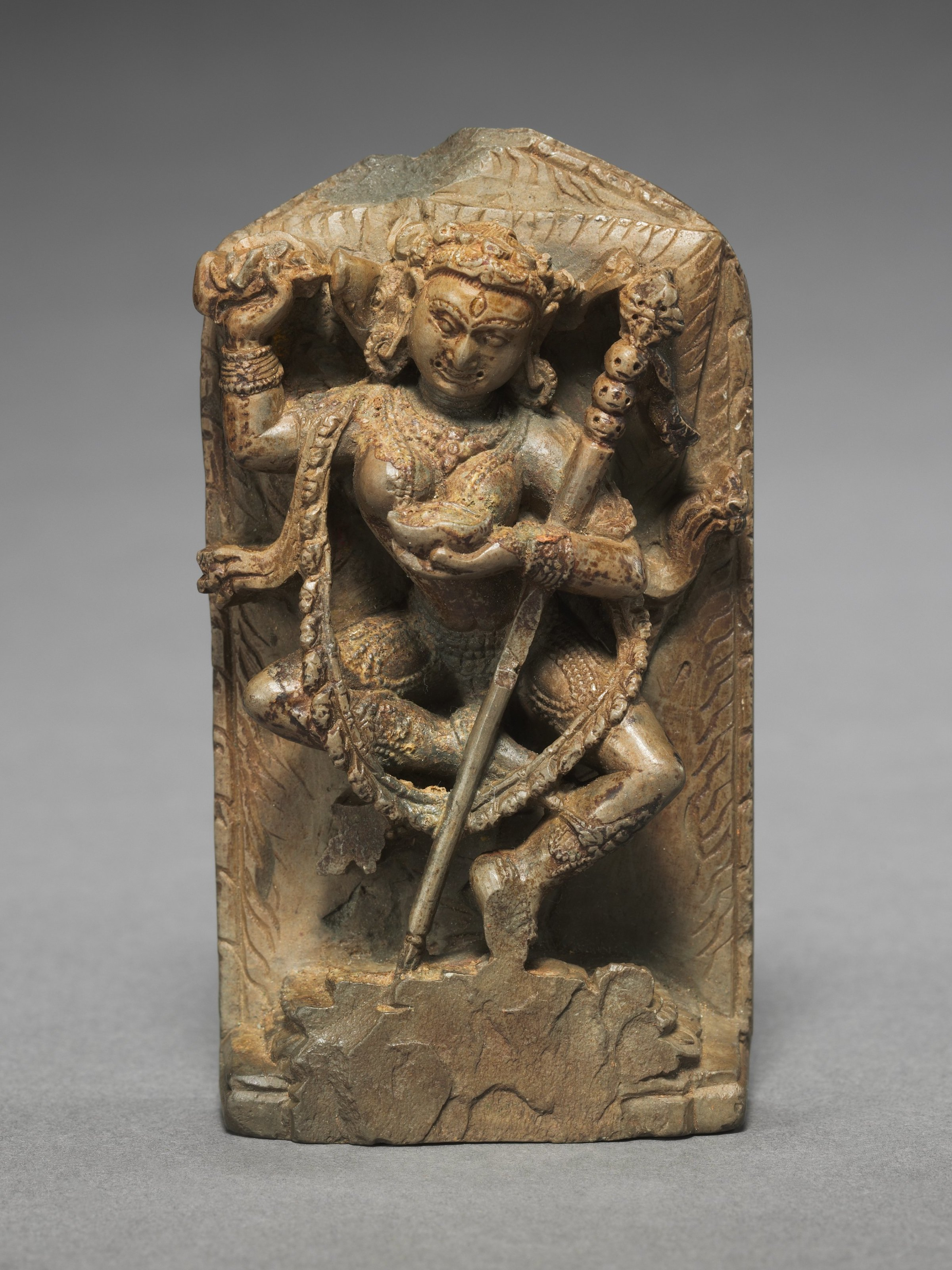
Dancing Vajravārāhī, a Buddhist tantric deity, Nepal, 11th–12th century

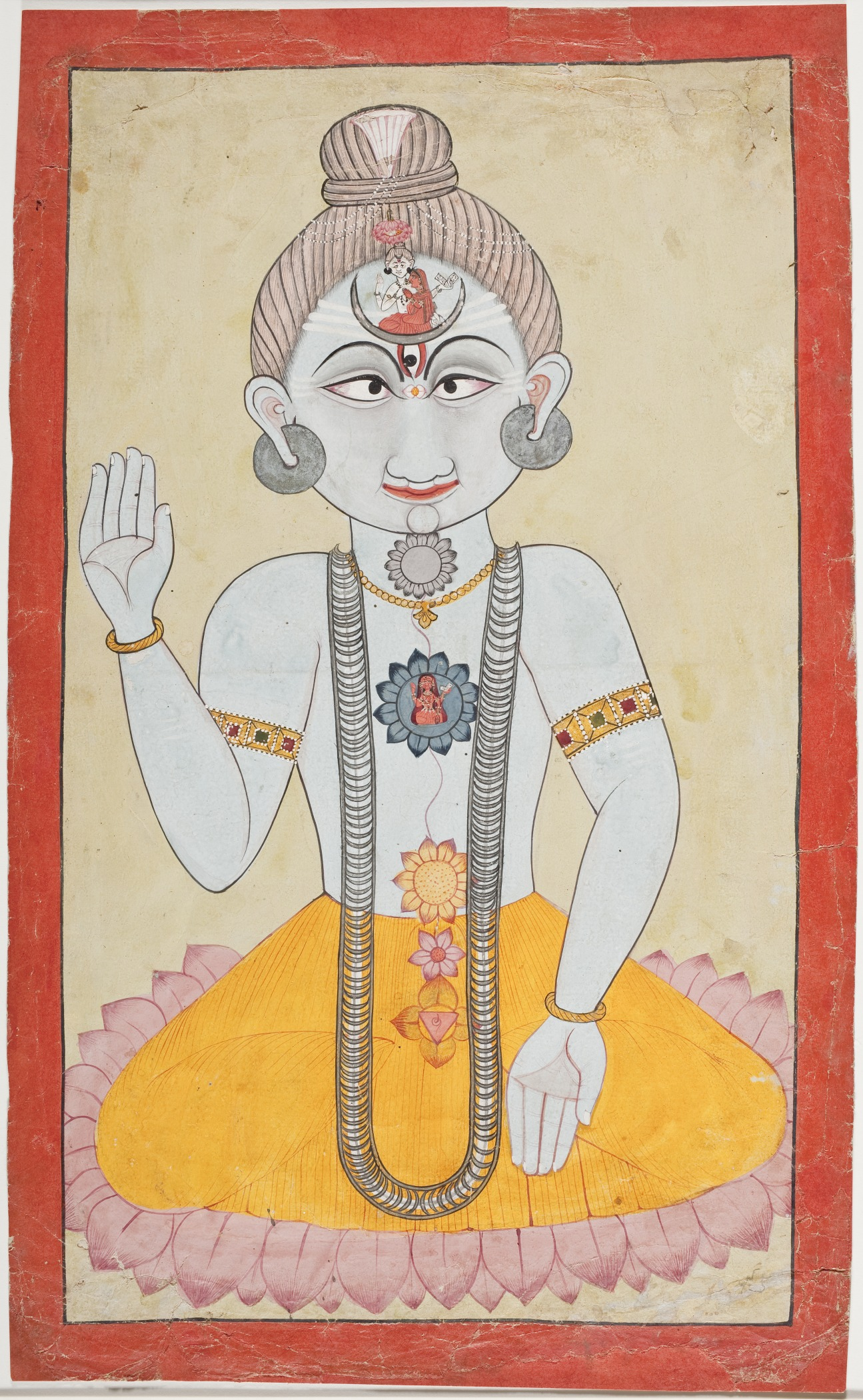
Illustration of a yogi and their chakras

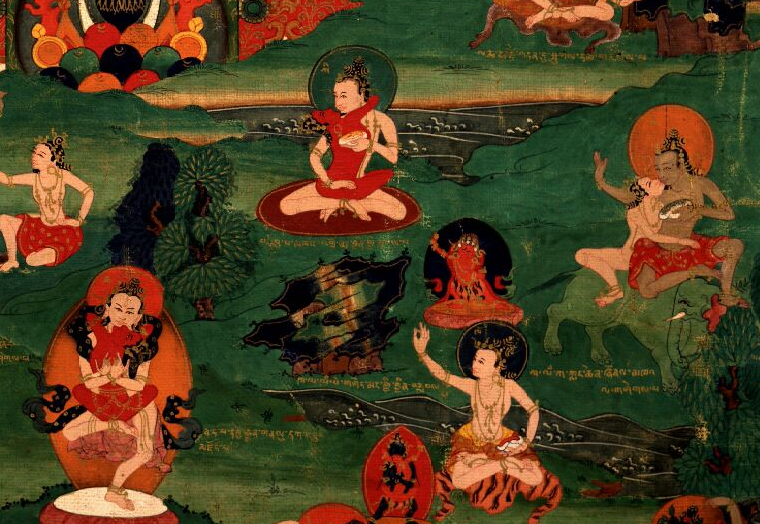
Buddhist Mahasiddhas practicing the sexual yoga of karmamudrā ("action seal")

According to Peter C. Bisschop, the expansion of the Pāśupata Śaivite movement (early CE) throughout North India gave rise to different forms of Śaivism, eventually leading to the emergence of various tantric traditions.

According to David B. Gray, Vajrayana originated from pre-existing Tantric traditions, also known as 'Tantrism', which emerged within Hinduism during the first millennium CE. These early Hindu tantric practices had a profound influence on South Asian Mahāyāna Buddhism, leading to the emergence of distinct Buddhist tantric traditions in the 7th century CE. These traditions quickly spread across Southeast, East, and Central Asia, giving rise to unique forms in East Asia and Tibet.

According to Gavin Flood, the earliest date for the Tantra texts related to Tantric practices is 600 CE, though most of them were probably composed after the 8th century onwards. According to Flood, very little is known about who created the Tantras, nor much is known about the social status of these and medieval era Tantrikas.

Flood states that the pioneers of Tantra may have been ascetics who lived at the cremation grounds, possibly from "above low-caste groups", and were probably non-Brahmanical and possibly part of an ancient tradition. By the early medieval times, their practices may have included the imitation of deities such as Kali and Bhairava, with offerings of non-vegetarian food, alcohol and sexual substances. According to this theory, these practitioners would have invited their deities to enter them, then reverted the role in order to control that deity and gain its power. These ascetics would have been supported by low castes living at the cremation places.

According to Samuel, a key element in the development of tantra was "the gradual transformation of local and regional deity cults through which fierce male and, particularly, female deities came to take a leading role in the place of the yaksa deities." Samuel states that this took place between the fifth to eighth centuries CE. According to Samuel, there are two main scholarly opinions on these terrifying goddesses which became incorporated into Śaiva and Buddhist Tantra. The first view is that they originate out of a pan-Indian religious substrate that was not Vedic. Another opinion is to see these fierce goddesses as developing out of the Vedic religion.

Alexis Sanderson has argued that tantric practices originally developed in a Śaiva milieu and were later adopted by Buddhists. He cites numerous elements that are found in the Śaiva Vidyapitha literature, including whole passages and lists of pithas, that seem to have been directly borrowed by Vajrayana texts. This has been criticized by Ronald M. Davidson, however, due to the uncertain date of the Vidyapitha texts. Davidson argues that the pithas seem to have been neither uniquely Buddhist nor Śaiva, but frequented by both groups. He also states that the Śaiva tradition was also involved in the appropriation of local deities and that tantra may have been influenced by tribal Indian religions and their deities. Samuel writes that "the female divinities may well best be understood in terms of a distinct Śākta milieu from which both Śaivas and Buddhists were borrowing", but that other elements, like the Kapalika style practices, are more clearly derived from a Śaiva tradition.

There is considerable evidence that the Hevajra and Cakrasamvara tantras borrow significant portions from Saiva sources. The text Cakrasamvara and its commentaries have revealed numerous attempts by the Buddhists to enlarge and modify it, both to remove references to Saiva deities and to add more Buddhist technical terminology.

==== Vamachara ====
Vamachara is used to describe a particular mode of tantric worship or sadhana (spiritual practice) that uses heterodox methods to sublimate for spiritual growth. These tantric practices also included secret initiation ceremonies in which individuals would enter the tantric family (kula) and receive the secret mantras of the tantric deities. These initiations included the consumption of the sexual substances (semen and female sexual secretions) produced through ritual sex between the guru and his consort. These substances were seen as spiritually powerful and were also used as offerings for tantric deities.

For both Śaivas and Buddhists, tantric practices often took place at important sacred sites (pithas) associated with fierce goddesses. Samuel writes that "we do not have a clear picture of how this network of pilgrimage sites arose." Whatever the case, it seems that it was in these ritual spaces visited by both Buddhists and Śaivas that the practice of Kaula and Anuttarayoga Tantra developed during the eighth and ninth centuries. Besides the practices outlined above, these sites also saw the practice of animal sacrifice as blood offerings to Śākta goddesses like Kamakhya. This practice is mentioned in Śākta texts like the Kālikāpurāṇa and the Yoginītantra. In some of these sites, such as Kamakhya Pitha, animal sacrifice is still widely practiced by Śāktas.

Samuel states that transgressive and antinomian tantric practices developed in both Buddhist and Brahmanical (mainly Śaiva ascetics like the Kapalikas) contexts and that "Śaivas and Buddhists borrowed extensively from each other, with varying degrees of acknowledgement." According to Samuel, these deliberately transgressive practices included, "night time orgies in charnel grounds, involving the eating of human flesh, the use of ornaments, bowls and musical instruments made from human bones, sexual relations while seated on corpses, and the like."

Samuel writes that the Saiva Tantra tradition appears to have originated as ritual sorcery carried out by hereditary caste groups (kulas) and associated with sex, death and fierce goddesses. The initiation rituals involved the consumption of the mixed sexual secretions (the clan essence) of a male guru and his consort. These practices were adopted by Kapalika styled ascetics and influenced the early Nath siddhas. Over time, the more extreme external elements were replaced by internalized yogas that make use of the subtle body. Sexual ritual became a way to reach the liberating wisdom taught in the tradition.

Another key and innovative feature of medieval tantric systems was the development of internal yogas based on elements of the subtle body (sūkṣma śarīra). This subtle anatomy held that there were channels in the body (nadis) through which certain substances or energies (such as vayu, prana, kundalini, and shakti) flowed. These yogas involved moving these energies through the body to clear out certain knots or blockages (granthi) and to direct the energies to the central channel (avadhuti, sushumna), with the aim of obtaining magical powers (siddhis), immortality, as well as spiritual liberation (moksha, nirvana). These yogic practices are also closely related to the practice of sexual yoga, since sexual intercourse was seen as being involved in the stimulation of the flow of these energies. Samuel thinks that these subtle body practices may have been influenced by Chinese Daoist practices.

One of the earliest mentions of sexual yoga practice is in the Buddhist Mahāyānasūtrālamkāra of Asanga (c. 5th century), which states "Supreme self-control is achieved in the reversal of sexual intercourse in the blissful Buddha-poise and the untrammelled vision of one's spouse." According to David Snellgrove, the text's mention of a 'reversal of sexual intercourse' might indicate the practice of withholding ejaculation. Snellgrove states that it is possible that sexual yoga was already being practiced in Buddhist circles at this time, and that Asanga saw it as a valid practice. Likewise, Samuel thinks that there is a possibility that sexual yoga existed in the fourth or fifth centuries (though not in the same transgressive tantric contexts where it was later practiced).

It is only in the seventh and eighth centuries however that we find substantial evidence for these sexual yogas. Unlike previous Upanishadic sexual rituals however, which seem to have been associated with Vedic sacrifice and mundane ends like childbirth, these sexual yogas were associated with the movement of subtle body energies (like Kundalini and Chandali, which were also seen as goddesses), and also with spiritual ends. These practices seemed to have developed at around the same time in both Saiva and Buddhist circles, and are associated with figures such as Tirumülar, Gorakhnath, Virupa, Naropa.

According to Jacob Dalton, ritualized sexual yoga (along with the sexual elements of the tantric initiation ritual, like the consumption of sexual fluids) first appears in Buddhist works called Mahayoga tantras (which include the Guhyagarbha and Guhyasamaja). These texts "focused on the body's interior, on the anatomical details of the male and female sexual organs and the pleasure generated through sexual union." In these texts, sexual energy was also seen as a powerful force that could be harnessed for spiritual practice and according to Samuel "perhaps create the state of bliss and loss of personal identity which is homologised with liberating insight." These sexual yogas continued to develop further into more complex systems which are found in texts dating from about the ninth or tenth century, including the Saiva Kaulajñānanirṇaya and Kubjikātantra as well as the Buddhist Hevajra, and Cakrasamvara tantras which make use of charnel ground symbolism and fierce goddesses. Samuel writes that these later texts also combine the sexual yoga with a system of controlling the energies of the subtle body.

The Buddhists developed their own corpus of Tantras, which also drew on various Mahayana doctrines and practices, as well as on elements of the fierce goddess tradition and also on elements from the Śaiva traditions (such as deities like Bhairava, which were seen as having been subjugated and converted to Buddhism).

Between the eighth and tenth centuries, new tantras emerged which included fierce deities, kula style sexual initiations, subtle body practices and sexual yoga. The later Buddhist tantras are known as the "inner" or "unsurpassed yoga" (Anuttarayoga or "Yogini") tantras. According to Samuel, it seems that these sexual practices were not initially practiced by Buddhist monastics and instead developed outside of the monastic establishments among traveling siddhas.

==== Dakshinachara ====
Dakshinachara is used to describe tantric sects that do not engage in heterodox practices. The Brahma Yamala, a tantric text, asserts that there are three currents of tradition (dakshina, vama, and madhyama) characterized respectively by the predominance of each of the three gunas (sattva, rajas, and tamas). According to this text, dakshina is characterized by sattva, and is pure; madhyama (a balance of the two), characterized by rajas, is mixed; and vama, characterized by tamas, is impure. The tantras of each class follow a particular line of spiritual practice. N. N. Bhattacharyya explains the Sanskrit technical term ācāra as follows:

The means of spiritual attainment which varies from person to person according to competence.... Ācāras are generally of seven kinds – Veda, Vaiṣṇava, Śaiva, Dakṣiṇa, Vāma, Siddhāṇta, and Kaula, falling into two broad categories – Dakṣiṇa and Vāma. Interpretations vary regarding the nature and grouping of the ācāras.

Some Buddhist tantras (sometimes called "lower" or "outer" tantras), do not make use of transgression, sex and fierce deities. These earlier Buddhist tantras mainly reflect a development of Mahayana theory and practice (like deity visualization) and a focus on ritual and purity.

=== Tantric age ===
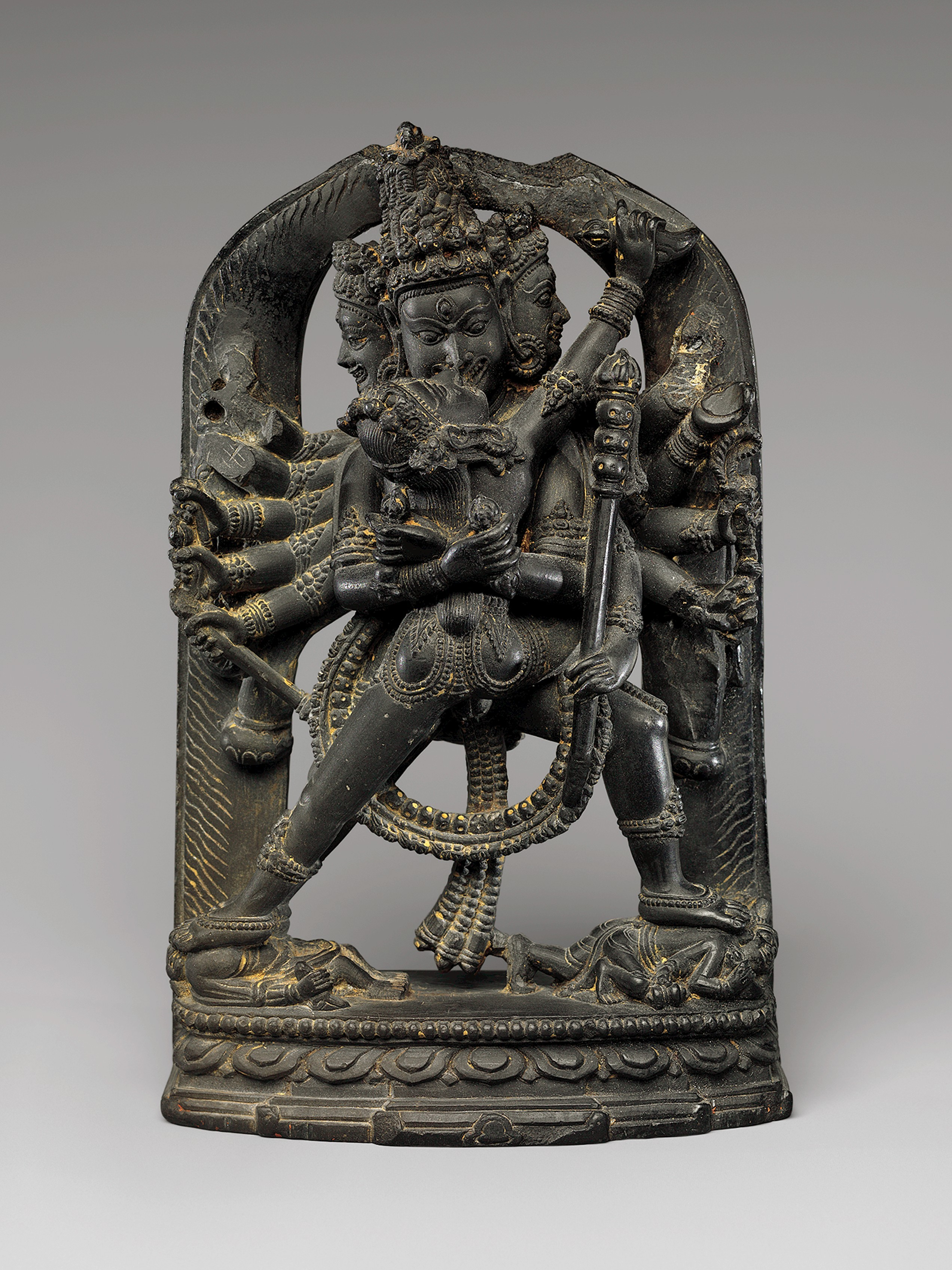
Twelve-Armed Chakrasamvara and His Consort Vajravarahi, c. 12th century, India (Bengal) or Bangladesh

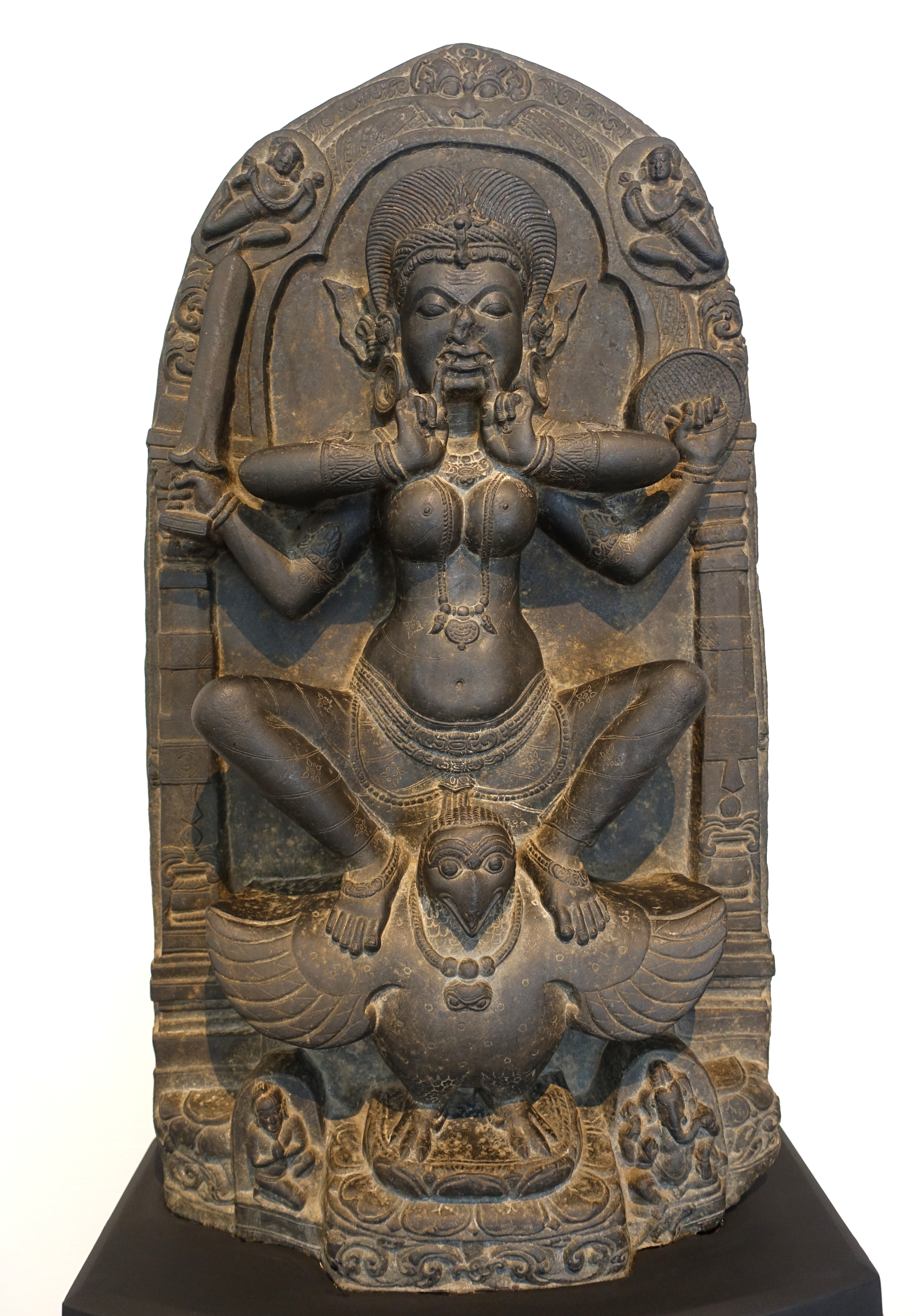
Yogini, East India, 11th–12th century CE. Matsuoka Museum of Art, Tokyo, Japan

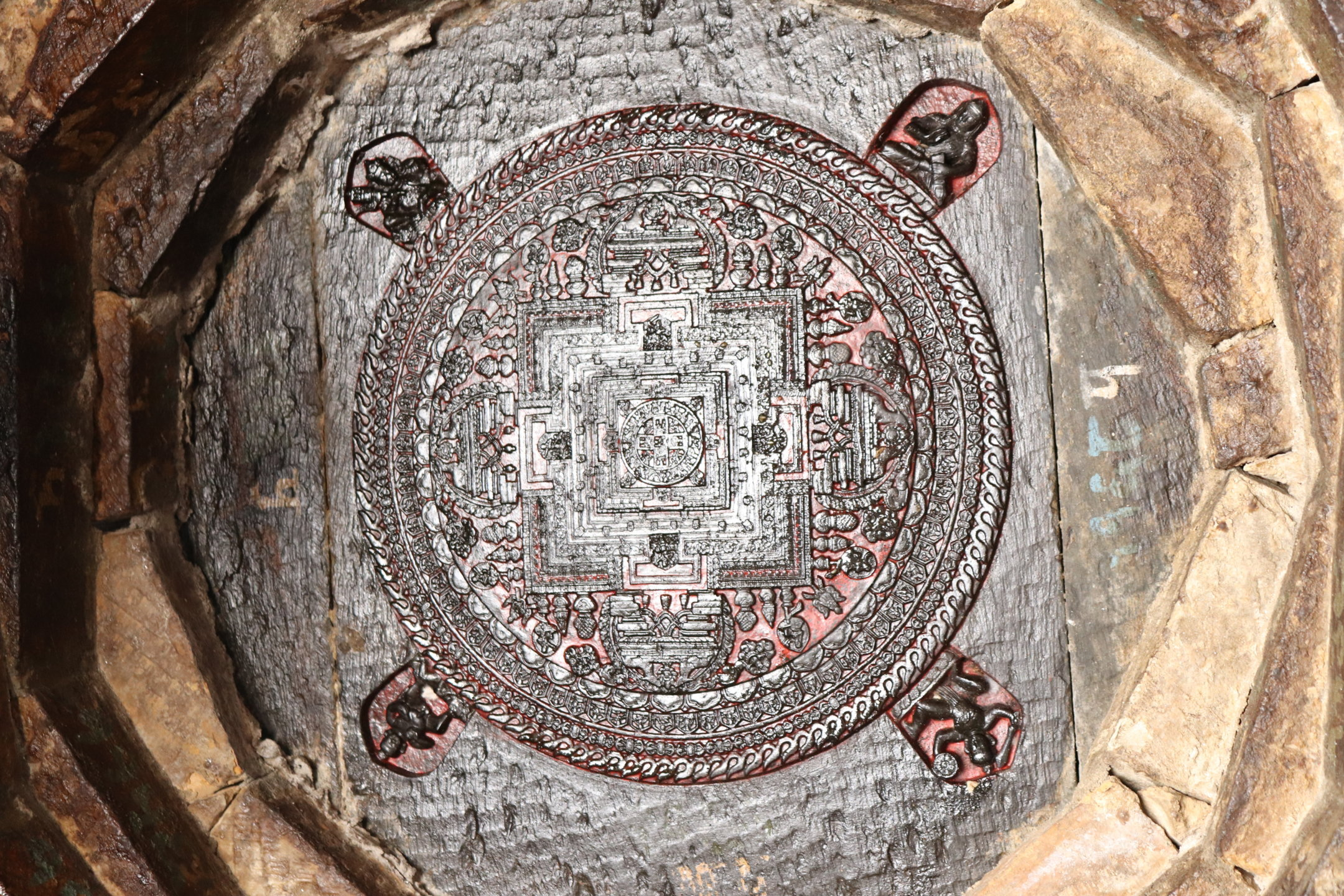
A stone Kālacakra Mandala at the Hiraṇyavarṇa Mahāvihāra, a Buddhist temple in Patan, Nepal, built in the 12th century

From the 8th to the 14th century, Tantric traditions rose to prominence and flourished throughout India and beyond. By the 10th century, the main elements of tantric practice had reached maturity and were being practiced in Saiva and Buddhist contexts. This period has been referred to as the 'Tantric Age' by some scholars due to prevalence of Tantra.

Also by the 10th century, numerous tantric texts had been written, particularly in Kashmir, Nepal and Bengal. By this time, Tantric texts had also been translated into regional languages such as Tamil, and Tantric practices had spread across South Asia. Tantra also spread into Tibet, Indonesia and China.

Gavin Flood describes the Tantric age as follows:

Tantrism has been so pervasive that all of Hinduism after the eleventh century, perhaps with the exception of the vedic Srauta tradition, is influenced by it. All forms of Saiva, Vaisnava and Smarta religion, even those forms which wanted to distance themselves from Tantrism, absorbed elements derived from the Tantras.

Though the whole northern and Himalayan part of India was involved in the development of tantra, Kashmir was a particularly important center, both Saiva and Buddhist and numerous key tantric texts were written there according to Padoux.

According to Alexis Sanderson, the Śaiva Tantra traditions of medieval Kashmir were mainly divided between the dualistic Śaiva Siddhanta and the non-dualist theology found in Śakta lineages like the Trika, Krama and Kaula. The non-dualists generally accepted and made use of sexual and transgressive practices, while the dualists mostly rejected them.

Saiva tantra was especially successful because it managed to forge strong ties with South Asian kings who valued the power (shakti) of fierce deities like the warrior goddess Durga as a way to increase their own royal power. These kings took part in royal rituals led by Saiva "royal gurus" in which they were symbolically married to tantric deities and thus became the earthly representative of male gods like Shiva. Saiva tantra could also employ a variety of protection and destruction rituals which could be used for the benefit of the kingdom and the king. Tantric Shaivism was adopted by the kings of Kashmir, as well as by the Somavamshis of Odisha, the Kalachuris, and the Chandelas of Jejakabhukti (in Bundelkhand). There is also evidence of state support from the Cambodian Khmer Empire.

During the Tantric Age, Buddhist Tantra was embraced by the Mahayana Buddhist mainstream and was studied at the great universities such as Nalanda and Vikramashila, from which it spread to Tibet and to the East Asian states of China, Korea, and Japan.

This new Tantric Buddhism was supported by the Pala Dynasty (8th–12th century) which supported these centers of learning and also built grand tantric temples and monasteries such as Somapura Mahavihara and Odantapuri. It established good relations with the Tibetan Empire and Srivijaya Empire, where the Buddhist Mahasiddhas of the Vajrayana tradition spread their influence. The later Khmer kings and the Indonesian Srivijaya kingdom also supported tantric Buddhism.

According to Samuel, while the sexual and transgressive practices were mostly undertaken in symbolic form (or through visualization) in later Tibetan Buddhist monastic contexts, it seems that in the eighth to tenth century Indian context, they were actually performed.

In the 10th and 11th centuries, both Shaiva and Buddhist tantra evolved into more tame, philosophical, and liberation-oriented religions. This transformation saw a move from external and transgressive rituals towards a more internalized yogic practice focused on attaining spiritual insight. This recasting also made tantric religions much less open to attack by other groups.

In Shaivism, this development is often associated with the Kashmiri master Abhinavagupta (c. 950 – 1016 CE) and his followers, as well the movements which were influenced by their work, like the Sri Vidya tradition (which spread as far as South India, and has been referred to as "high" tantra).

In Buddhism, this taming of tantra is associated with the adoption of tantra by Buddhist monastics who sought to incorporate it within the Buddhist Mahayana scholastic framework. Buddhist tantras were written down and scholars like Abhayakaragupta wrote commentaries on them. Another important figure, the Bengali teacher Atisha, wrote a treatise which placed tantra as the culmination of a graduated Mahayana path to awakening, the Bodhipathapradīpa. In his view, one needed to first begin practicing non-tantric Mahayana, and then later one might be ready for tantra.

This system became the model for tantric practice among some Tibetan Buddhist schools, like the Gelug. In Tibet, the transgressive and sexual practices of tantra became much less central and tantric practice was seen as suitable only for a small elite group. New tantras continued to be composed during this later period as well, such as the Kalachakra (c. 11th century), which seems to be concerned with converting Buddhists and non-Buddhists alike, and uniting them together against Islam. The Kalachakra teaches sexual yoga, but also warns not to introduce the practice of ingesting impure substances to beginners, since this is only for advanced yogis. This tantra also seems to want to minimize the impact of the transgressive practices, since it advises tantrikas to outwardly follow the customs of their country.

Another influential development during this period was the codification of tantric yogic techniques that would later become the separate movement known as Hatha Yoga. According to James Mallinson, the original "source text" for Hatha Yoga is the Vajrayana Buddhist Amṛtasiddhi (11th century CE) attributed to the mahasiddha Virupa. This text was later adopted by Saiva yogic traditions (such as the Naths) and is quoted in their texts.

Another tradition of Hindu Tantra developed among the Vaishnavas, this was called the Pāñcarātra Agama tradition. This tradition avoided the transgressive and sexual elements that were embraced by the Saivas and the Buddhists. There is also a smaller tantric tradition associated with Surya, the sun god.

Jainism also seems to have developed a substantial Tantra corpus based on the Saura tradition, with rituals based on yakshas and yakshinis. However, this Jain tantrism was mainly used for pragmatic purposes like protection, and was not used to attain liberation. Complete manuscripts of these Jain tantras have not survived. The Jains also seem to have adopted some of the subtle body practices of tantra, but not sexual yoga. The Svetambara thinker Hemacandra (c. 1089–1172) discusses tantric practices extensively, such as internal meditations on chakras, which betray Kaula and Nath influences.

=== Later developments ===
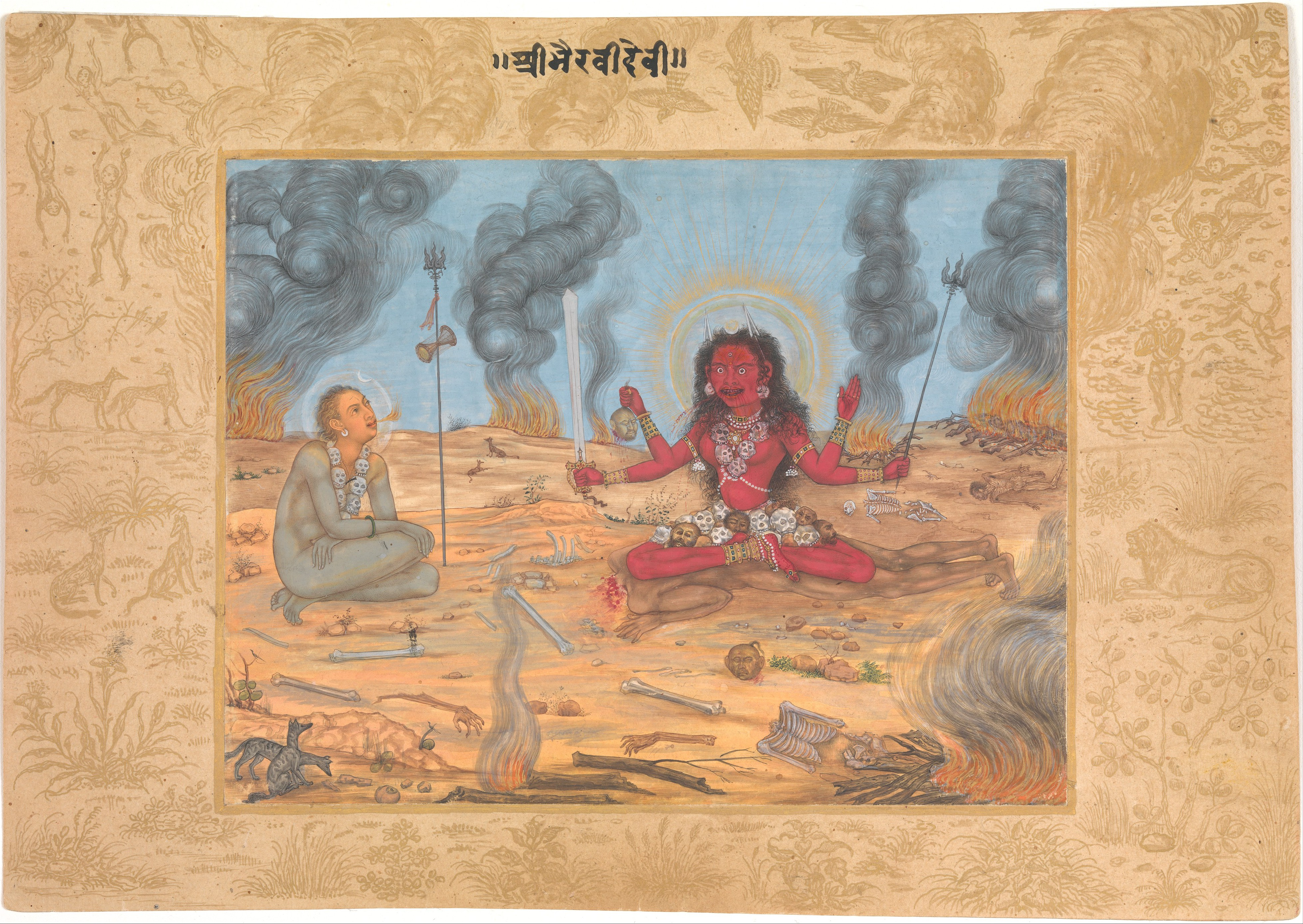
Tantric goddess Bhairavi and her consort Shiva depicted as Kāpālika ascetics, sitting in a charnel ground. Painting by Payāg from a 17th-century manuscript (c. 1630–1635), Metropolitan Museum of Art, New York City.

There seems to have been some debate regarding the appropriateness of tantra. Among the Hindus, those belonging to the more orthodox Vedic traditions rejected the Tantras. Some tantrikas incorporated Vedic ideas within their own systems, while considering the Tantras as the higher, more refined understanding. Meanwhile, other Tantrikas considered them complementary such as Umapati, who is quoted as stating: "The Veda is the cow, the true Agama its milk."

According to Samuel, the great Advaita philosopher Shankara (9th century) "is portrayed in his biography, the Sankaravijaya, as condemning the approaches of various kinds of Tantric practitioners and defeating them through argument or spiritual power." He also is said to have encouraged the replacement of fierce goddesses with benign female deities, and thus to have promoted the Sri Vidya tradition (which worships a peaceful and sweet goddess, Tripura Sundari). Though it is far from certain that Shankara actually campaigned against tantra, he is traditionally seen as someone who purified Hinduism from transgressive and antinomian tantric practices.

The 14th-century Indian scholar Mādhavācārya (in Sarva-Darsana-Sangraha) wrote copious commentaries on then existing major schools of Indian philosophies and practices, and cited the works of the 10th century Abhinavagupta, who was considered a major and influential Tantra scholar. However, Madhavacarya does not mention Tantra as a separate, distinct religious or ritual-driven practice.

The early 20th-century Indian scholar Pandurang Vaman Kane conjectured that Madhavacharya ignored Tantra because it may have been considered scandalous.

Hindu tantra, while practiced by some of the general lay population, was eventually overshadowed by the more popular Bhakti movements that swept throughout India from the 15th century onwards. According to Samuel, "these new devotional styles of religion, with their emphasis on emotional submission to a supreme saviour-deity, whether Saivite or Vaisnavite, were better adapted, perhaps, to the subaltern role of non-Muslim groups under Muslim rule." Saiva tantra did remain an important practice among most Saiva ascetics however. Tantric traditions also survived in certain regions, such as among the Naths of Rajasthan, in the Sri Vidya tradition of South India and in the Bengali Bauls.

Regarding the reception of tantra during the period of Hindu modernism in the 19th and 20th centuries, Samuel writes that this period saw "a radical reframing of yogic practices away from the Tantric context." Samuel notes that while Hindu Hatha yoga had its origins in a Saiva tantric context,

Given the extremely negative views of Tantra and its sexual and magical practices which prevailed in middle-class India in the late nineteenth and twentieth centuries, and still largely prevail today, this was an embarrassing heritage. Much effort was given by people such as Swami Vivekananda into reconstructing yoga, generally in terms of a selective Vedantic reading of Patañjali's Yogasutra (de Michelis 2004). The effort was largely successful, and many modern Western practitioners of yoga for health and relaxation have little or no knowledge of its original function as a preparation for the internal sexual practices of the Nath tradition.

In Buddhism, while tantra became accepted in the great Mahayana establishments of Nalanda and Vikramashila and spread to the Himalayan regions, it also experienced serious setbacks in other regions, particularly Southeast Asia. In Burma, for example, King Anawratha (1044–1077) is said to have disbanded tantric "Ari" monks.

As Theravada Buddhism became dominant in South East Asian states, tantric religions became marginalised in those regions. The quasi-tantric Esoteric Southern Buddhism, survives to this day in marginal forms.

In Sri Lanka, tantric Buddhism also suffered debilitating setbacks. Initially the large Abhayagiri Monastery was a place where the practice of Vajrayana seems to have flourished during the 8th century. However, Abhayagiri was disbanded and forced to convert to the orthodox Mahāvihāra sect during the reign of Parakramabahu I (1153–1186).

== Tantric traditions ==
=== Hindu tantra ===
Tantric texts and practitioners ("tantrikas" and "tantrinis") are often contrasted with Vedic texts and those who practice Vedic religion ("Vaidikas"). This non-Vedic path was often termed Mantramarga ("The way of mantras") or Tantrasastra ("Tantra teaching"). One of the most well known comments on this dichotomy is Kulluka Bhatta's statement in his 15th-century commentary to the Manusmriti which states that revelation (sruti) is twofold – Vedic and Tantric.

Hindu tantric teachings are generally seen as revelations from a divine being (such as Śiva, or the Goddess) which are considered by tantrikas to be superior to the Vedas in leading beings to liberation. They are also considered to be more effective during the Kali Yuga. However, tantric thinkers like Abhinavagupta, while considering tantra superior, do not totally reject Vedic teachings, and instead consider them valid at a lower level since they also derive from the same source, the supreme Godhead.

There are various Hindu tantric traditions within Shaivism, Shaktism and Vaishnavism. There are numerous tantric texts for these different traditions with different philosophical points of view, ranging from theistic dualism to absolute monism. (Note: Davis (2014), p. 13: "Some agamas argue a monist metaphysics, while others are decidedly dualist. Some claim ritual is the most efficacious means of religious attainment, while others assert that knowledge is more important.") These various traditions also differ among themselves on how heterodox and transgressive they are (vis a vis the Vedic tradition).

Since tantric rituals became so widespread, certain forms of tantra were eventually accepted by many orthodox Vedic thinkers such as Jayanta Bhatta and Yamunacarya as long as they did not contradict Vedic teaching and social rules. Tantric scriptures such as the Kali centered Jayadrathayamala also state that tantrikas can follow the Vedic social rules for convenience and for the benefit of their clan and guru. However, not all Vedic thinkers accepted tantra. For example, Kumarila Bhatta wrote that one should have no contact with tantrikas nor speak to them.

==== Śaiva and Śākta tantra ====
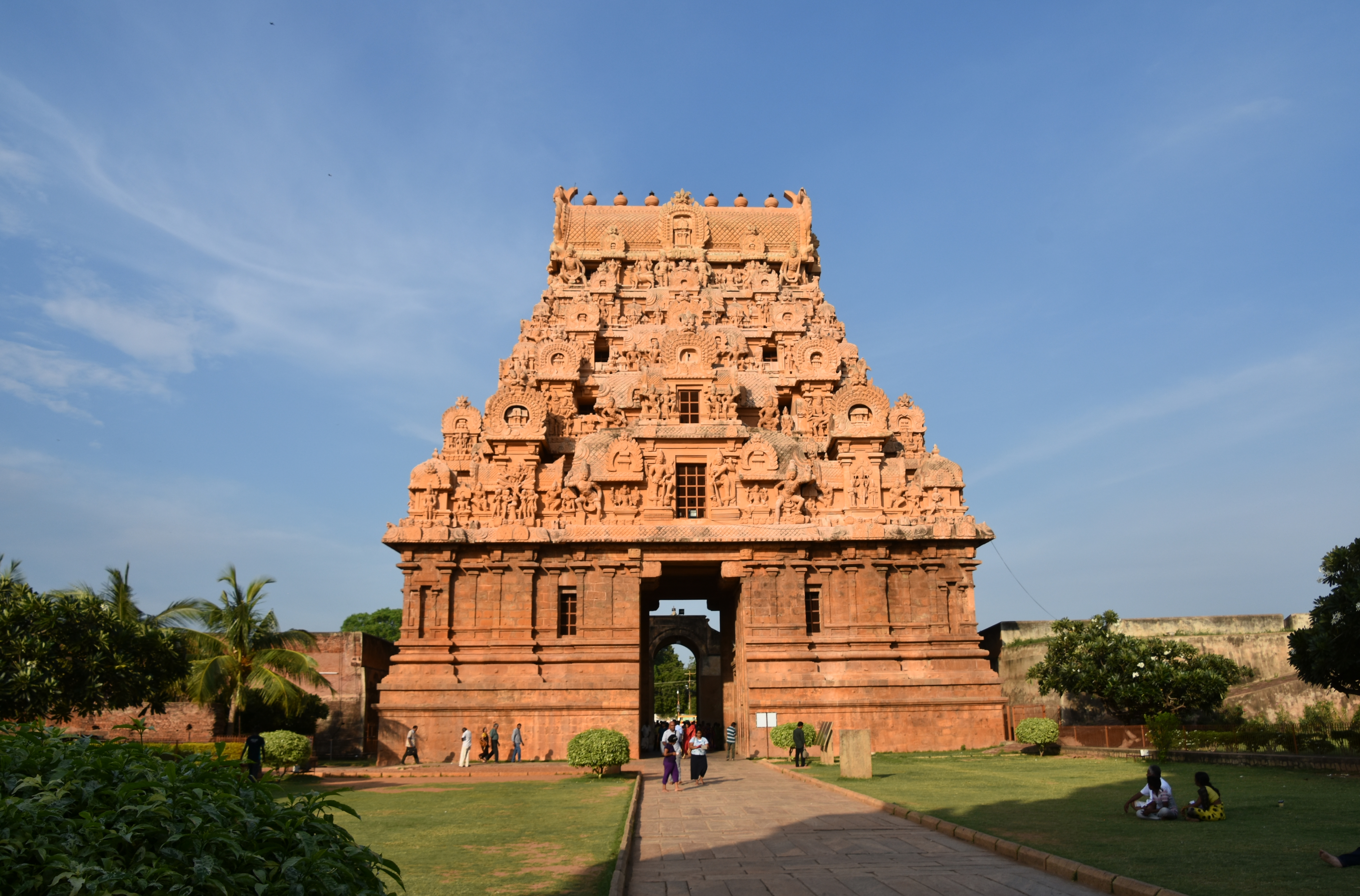
The Brihadishvara Temple, a Śaiva Siddhānta temple in Tamil Nadu

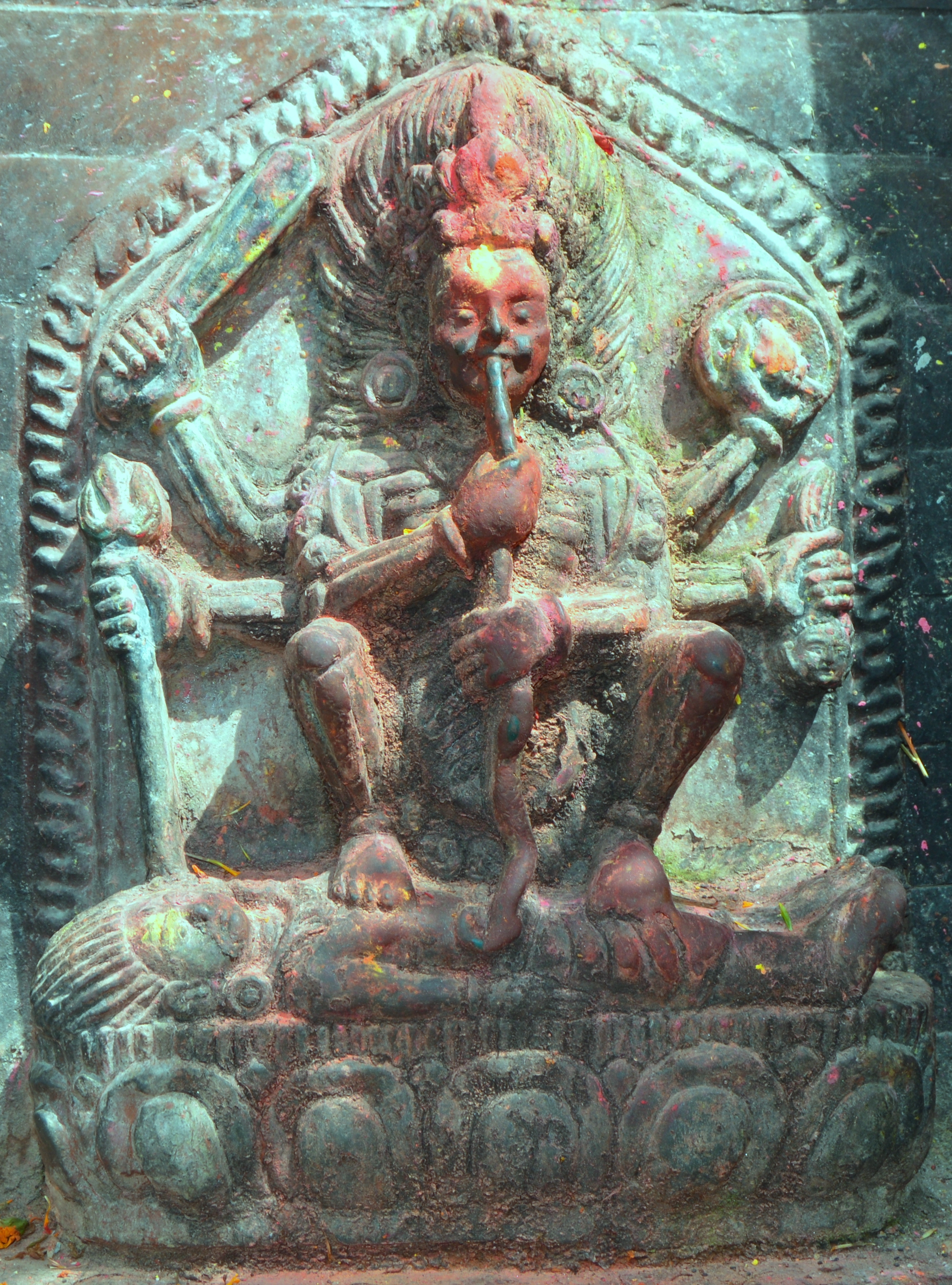
Nepalese depiction of the goddess Kali

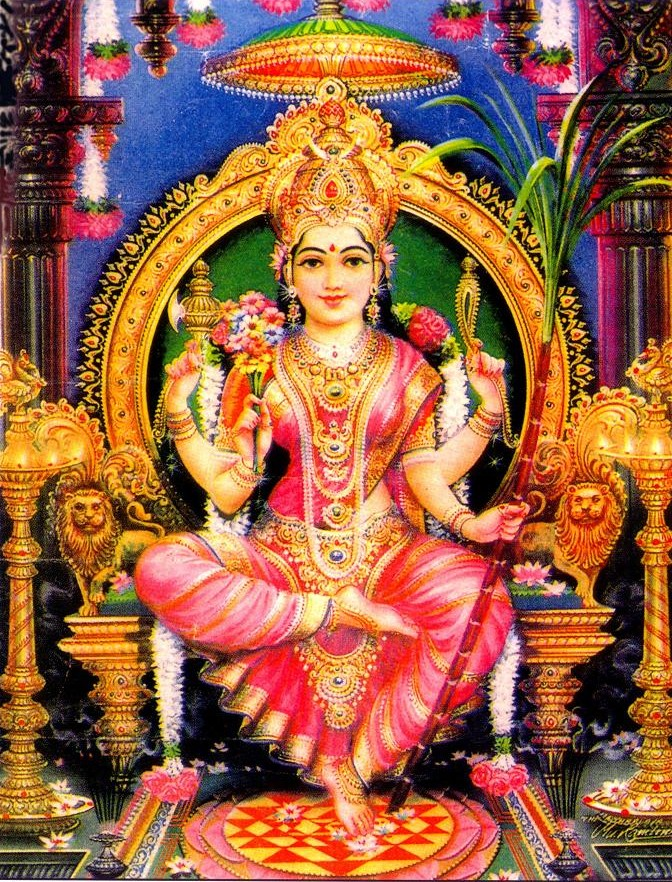
Śrī, also known as Lalitā Tripurasundarī ("beautiful in three worlds"), Adi Parashakti (the highest supreme energy), Kāmeśvarī (goddess of desire) and other names

Śaiva Tantra is called the Mantramārga, and is often seen as being a separate teaching than the ascetic "Atimārga" tradition (which includes the Pāśupatas and Kāpālikas). There are various doctrines, textual classes and schools of Shaiva Tantra, which often overlap with the Shakta tradition in different ways.

The Śaiva Siddhānta tradition is the earliest Śaiva Tantra school and was characterized by public rituals performed by priests. Some of their texts, like the Niśvāsatattvasaṃhitā have been dated to the fifth century. Their scriptures (the Śaiva Agamas) and basic doctrines are also shared by the other traditions as a common Śaiva doctrine and many of their rites are also used in other schools of Shaiva Tantra.

The prescriptions and rituals of the Śaiva Siddhānta Agamas are generally followed by Śaiva temples in South India and they are mostly compatible with orthodox Brahmanism, lacking terrifying deities and animal sacrifice.

The Mantrapīṭha tradition on the other hand, worships Svacchanda Bhairava, a terrifying form of Shiva also known as "Aghora" ("not fearsome"). This tradition promotes the Skull observance (Kapalavrata), that is, carrying a skull, a skull staff (khatavanga) and worshipping in cremation grounds. One contemporary group of Kapalika ascetics are the Aghoris.

There are also various traditions who are classified as "Vidyāpīṭha". The texts of this tradition focus on worshipping goddesses known as Yoginīs or Ḍākinīs and include antinomian practices dealing with charnel grounds and sexuality. These goddess centered traditions of the Śākta tantras are mostly of the "left" current (vamachara) and are thus considered more heterodox.

There are various Vidyāpīṭha traditions, which focus on a bipolar, bisexual divinity that is equal parts male and female, Śaiva and Śākta. The Yamalatantras worship Bhairava along with Kapalini, the goddess of the skull. The Goddess centered traditions are known as the Kulamārga (Path of the Clans), referring to the clans of the goddesses and their Shakti tantras, which may have been established around the 9th century. It includes sexual rituals, sanguinary practices, the ritual consumption of liquor and the importance of spirit possession. It includes various sub-traditions the developed in different regions of India, such as the Trika lineage (which worships a trio of deities: Parā, Parāparā, and Aparā), the tradition of the fierce goddess Guhyakālī, Krama tradition, focusing on the goddess Kālī, the Kubjikā cult, and the southern tradition which worships the beautiful goddess Kāmeśvarī or Tripurasundarī.

During the 10th century, the syncretic nondual tradition of Kashmir Śaivism developed. According to Alexis Sanderson, this tradition arose out of the confrontation between the dualistic and more orthodox Śaiva Siddhānta and the nondual transgressive traditions of the Trika and Krama. According to David B. Gray, this school integrated elements from both of these traditions, "the end result was a nondualistic system in which the transgressive elements were internalized and hence rendered less offensive to the orthodox."

The philosophers of Kashmir Śaivism, especially Abhinavagupta (c. 975–1025 ce) and his student Jayaratha, are some of the most influential philosophers who wrote on Hindu tantra. These thinkers synthesized the various goddess and Śaiva lineages and philosophies into a comprehensive and influential religious system. According to David White, Abhinavagupta "sublimates, cosmeticizes, and semanticizes many of its practices into a type of meditative asceticism whose aim is to realize a transcendent subjectivity". Thus, his work domesticated the radically antinomian practices of Vidyāpīṭha lineages into meditative exercises.

In Nepal, the Sarvamnaya tantra system evolved as a tantrik tradition which drew upon the āmnāya system. Amnaya is often translated as 'transmission'. This system serves as the guiding source for the tradition of worship of deities that emanate from the five different aspects of Lord Śiva. At its core, the concept of Āmnāya revolves around the idea that Śiva, with his five faces, (referred to as Sadashiva), imparts the secret Tantric teachings to the goddess through her corresponding five emanations.

The last major Śaiva tantric tradition is that of the Nāth or "Split-Ear" Kānphaṭa tradition, which emerged in the 12th or 13th century. They produced various Haṭhayoga texts which draw on tantric yogas.

While the Śākta traditions continued to develop in different ways, sometimes in a more popular and devotional direction, many of them retain various tantric elements today.

The two most important and popular Śākta tantra traditions today are the Southern Kaula transmission, which focus on the beautiful goddess Śrī (śrīkula) or Lalitā Tripurasundarī and the Northern and Eastern transmission, focusing on the ferocious goddess Kālī (kālīkula), which remains a popular goddess in India.

The southern transmission gave rise to the Śrī Vidyā tradition, an important tantric religion in South India. Though it takes much of its philosophical and doctrinal system from Kashmir Shaivism, it generally avoids the transgressive elements and is orthodox or "right handed". Bhaskararaya (18th century) is considered a key thinker of this tradition.

==== Vaiṣṇava ====
The main Vaiṣṇava tradition that is associated with tantra is the Pañcharatra. This tradition produced a number of tantric texts including Lakshmi tantra, but most of the other tantras are lost. However, this sect does not identify itself as "tantric". The worship and ritual of most of the Vaiṣṇava temples in South India follow this tradition, which is ritually similar to the Shaiva Siddhanta. According to Padoux, "from the doctrinal point of view, they are nearer to brahmanical orthodoxy (proudly asserted by some of their affiliates) and their mantras are indeed often Vedic."

According to David B. Gray,

During the medieval period another tantric Vaiṣṇava tradition emerged in Bengal. Known as the Sahajiyā tradition, it flourished in Bengal around the 16th through 19th centuries. It taught that each individual is a divinity, embodying the divine couple Kṛṣṇa and his consort Rādhā. This tradition integrated earlier Hindu and Buddhist tantric practices within a Vaiṣṇava theological framework.

=== Buddhist tantra ===
There are various Buddhist tantric traditions, which are called by different names such as Vajrayana, Secret Mantra, or Mantrayana. (Note: Lewis & deAngelis (2016), pp. 73–77: "The Tantric Buddhist traditions have been given several labels, but there is no single label that is accepted by all of these traditions. [...] It is important to note the use of this term in a plural form. Tantric or esoteric Buddhist traditions are multiple and also originated as multiple, distinct traditions of both text and practice.")

The Indo-Tibetan Buddhist tradition has been dominant in Tibet and the Himalayan regions. It first spread to Tibet in the 8th century and quickly rose to prominence. The Tibetan Buddhist tantric teachings have recently been spread to the Western world by the Tibetan diaspora.

Nepalese Newar Buddhism meanwhile is practiced in the Kathmandu Valley by the Newar people. The tradition maintains a canon of Sanskrit texts, the only Buddhist tantric tradition to still do so.

Buddhist Tantric practices and texts which developed from the 5th to the 8th centuries were translated into Chinese and are preserved in the Chinese Buddhist canon as well as in the Dunhuang manuscripts. Tantric materials involving the use of mantras and dharanis began to appear in China during the fifth century period, and Buddhist masters such as Zhiyi developed proto-tantric rituals based on esoteric texts.

Chinese Esoteric Buddhism became especially influential in China in the Tang dynasty period with the arrival of esoteric masters such as Vajrabodhi and Amoghavajra to the capital city of Chang'an. The succeeding Song dynasty saw an influx of new esoteric texts being transmitted by monks from Central Asia. Chinese Esoteric Buddhist rituals were also noted to be particularly popular in the Liao dynasty, which contended with the Song for control of northern China.

Due to the highly eclectic nature of Chinese Buddhism, sectarian denominations were not strictly drawn between the various Buddhist schools (even during the Tang dynasty). Since most Buddhist masters mixed practices from the different traditions, Chinese Esoteric Buddhist practices were absorbed by lineages from the other Buddhist traditions such as Chan and Tiantai. For example, the Northern School of Chan even became known for its esoteric practices of dhāraṇīs and mantras.

During the Yuan and Ming dynasty periods, certain esoteric elements from Tibetan Buddhism were also adapted and incorporated into general Chinese Buddhist practices and rituals. In modern Chinese Buddhism, the esoteric traditions continue to be passed on and practiced through numerous tantric rituals such as the Shuilu Fahui ceremony and the Yujia Yankou rite, which involve practices like deity yoga and mandala offerings, as well as the recitation of tantric mantras such as the Cundī Dhāraṇī, the Hundred Syllable Mantra of Vajrasattva, the Mahācakravidyārāja Dhāraṇī and the Shurangama Mantra.

Esoteric practices also spread to Korea and Japan, where it exists in the Shingon school.

=== Other religions ===
The Hindu and Buddhist Tantric traditions significantly influenced other religions such as Jainism, Sikhism, the Tibetan Bön tradition, Daoism, Shintō, Sufi Islam, and the Western New Age movement.

In the Sikh literature, the ideas related to Shakti and goddess reverence attributed to Guru Gobind Singh, particularly in the Dasam Granth, are related to tantra ideas found in Buddhism and Hinduism.

The Jain worship methods, states Ellen Gough, were likely influenced by Shaktism ideas, and this is attested by the tantric diagrams of the Rishi-mandala where the Tirthankaras are portrayed. The Tantric traditions within Jainism use verbal spells or mantra, and rituals that are believed to accrue merit for rebirth realms.

== Practices ==
One of the main elements of the Tantric literature is rituals. Rather than one coherent system, Tantra is an accumulation of practices and ideas from different sources. These practices include: mandalas, mantras, sexual yogic practices, fierce male and female deities, and cremation ground symbolism.

André Padoux notes that there is no consensus among scholars as to which elements are characteristic for Tantra, nor is there any text that contains all those elements. Also, most of those elements can also be found in non-Tantric traditions. Because of the wide range of communities covered by the term, it is impossible to describe tantric practices definitively. However, there are sets of practices and elements which are shared by numerous tantric traditions.

David N. Lorenzen writes that tantra shares various "shamanic and yogic" practices, worship of goddesses, association with specific schools like the Kaulas and Kapalikas, as well as tantric texts.

Christopher Wallis meanwhile, basing himself on the definition given the tantric scholar Rāmakaṇṭha, gives four main features of tantra:

1. Concern with ritual modes of manipulation (of the environment or one's own awareness)
2. Requirement for esoteric initiation (to receive access to the scriptural teachings and practices)
3. A twofold goal of practice: the soteriological and supramundane one of liberation (variously conceived) and/or the mundane one of extraordinary power over other beings and one's environment
4. The claim that these three are explicated in scriptures that are the word of God (āgama) or the Buddha (buddhavacana)

According to Anthony Tribe, a scholar of Buddhist Tantra, Tantra has the following defining features:

1. Centrality of ritual, especially the worship of deities
2. Centrality of mantras
3. Visualisation of and identification with a deity
4. Need for initiation, esotericism and secrecy
5. Importance of a teacher (guru, acharya)
6. Ritual use of mandalas (maṇḍala)
7. Transgressive or antinomian acts
8. Revaluation of the body
9. Revaluation of the status and role of women
10. Analogical thinking (including microcosmic or macrocosmic correlation)
11. Revaluation of negative mental states

=== Worship and ritual ===
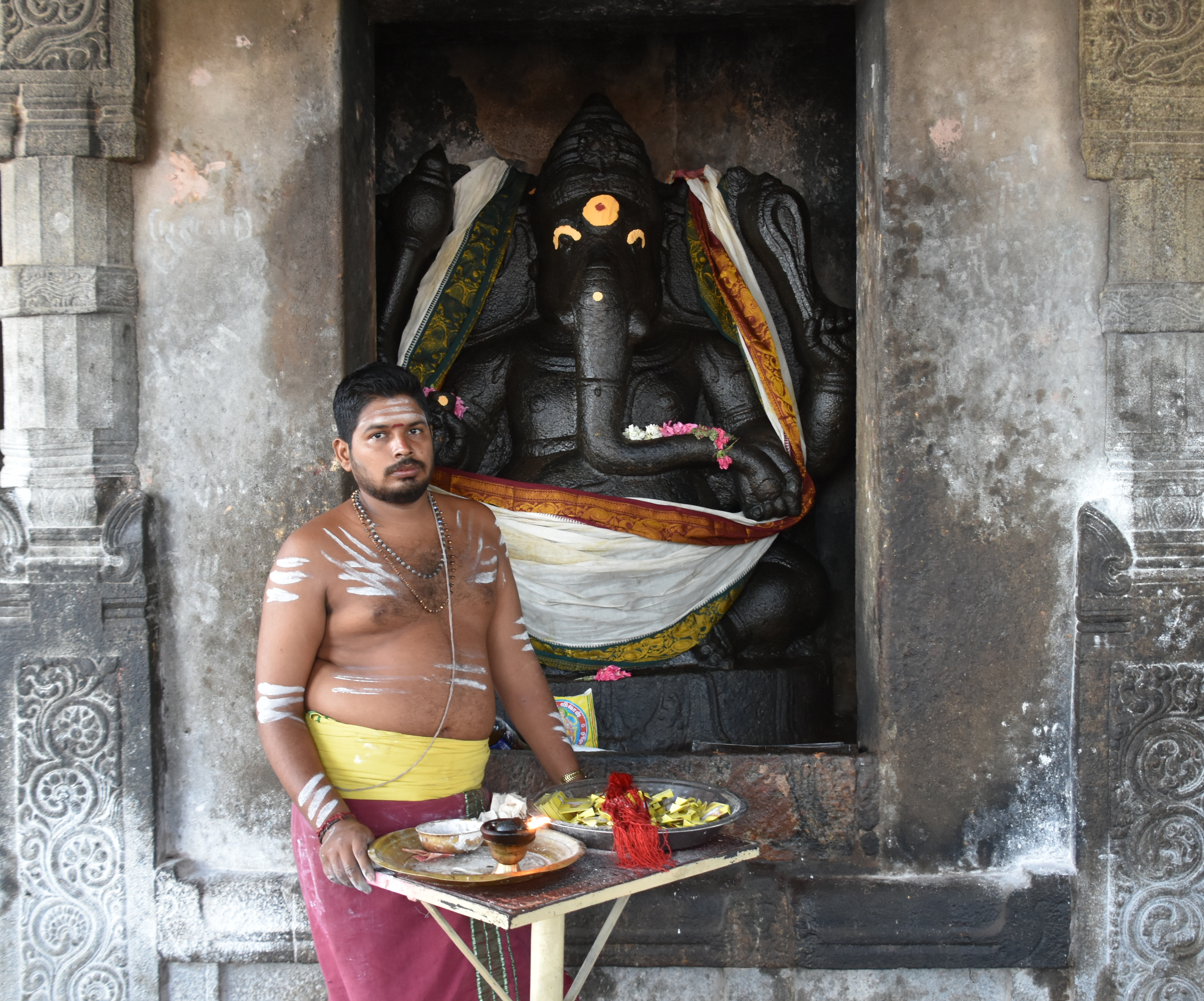
A Pujari in front of a Ganesha statue, Brihadishwara Shiva Temple

Worship or puja in Hindu Tantra differs from Vedic forms somewhat. While in the Vedic practice of yajna there are no idols, shrines, and symbolic art, in tantra they are important means of worship.

The idea behind these rituals is that all humans have a fundamental impurity (mala) that binds them to rebirth. This impurity can be removed by ritual action (along with proper knowledge). The initial step in this path is the ritual of initiation (diksa), which opens to door to future liberation at death.

In the non-dualistic and transgressive traditions like the Kali cults and the Trika school, rituals and pujas can include certain transgressive elements that are not found in the more orthodox traditions. These elements include the use of skulls and other human bone implements (as part of the Kapalika vow), fierce deities like Bhairava, Kubjika and Kali which were used as part of meditative visualizations, ritual possession by the deities (avesa), sexual rites and offering the deity (as well as consuming) certain impure substances like meat, alcohol and sexual fluids.

Padoux explains the transgressive practices as follows:

On the ritual and mental plane, transgression was an essential trait by which the nondualistic Tantric traditions set themselves apart from other traditions – so much so that they used the term "nondualistic practice" (advaitacara) to refer to the Kaula transgressive practices as a rejection of the duality (dvaita) of pure and impure in brahmanical society.

In both the Buddhist and Saiva contexts, the sexual practices are often seen as a way to expand one's consciousness through the use of bliss.

There is also a fundamental philosophical disagreement between Śaiva Siddhānta and the non-dualistic schools like the Trika regarding ritual. In Śaiva Siddhānta, only ritual can do away with "innate impurities" (anavamala) that bind individual Selfs, though the ritual must be performed with an understanding of their nature and purpose as well as with devotion. In the view of the Trika school (especially in the work of Abhinavagupta), only knowledge (jñana) which is a "recognition" (pratyabhijña) of our true nature, leads to liberation. According to Padoux, "this is also, with nuances, the position of the Pñcaratra and of other Vaisnava Tantric traditions."

=== Yoga, mantra, meditation ===
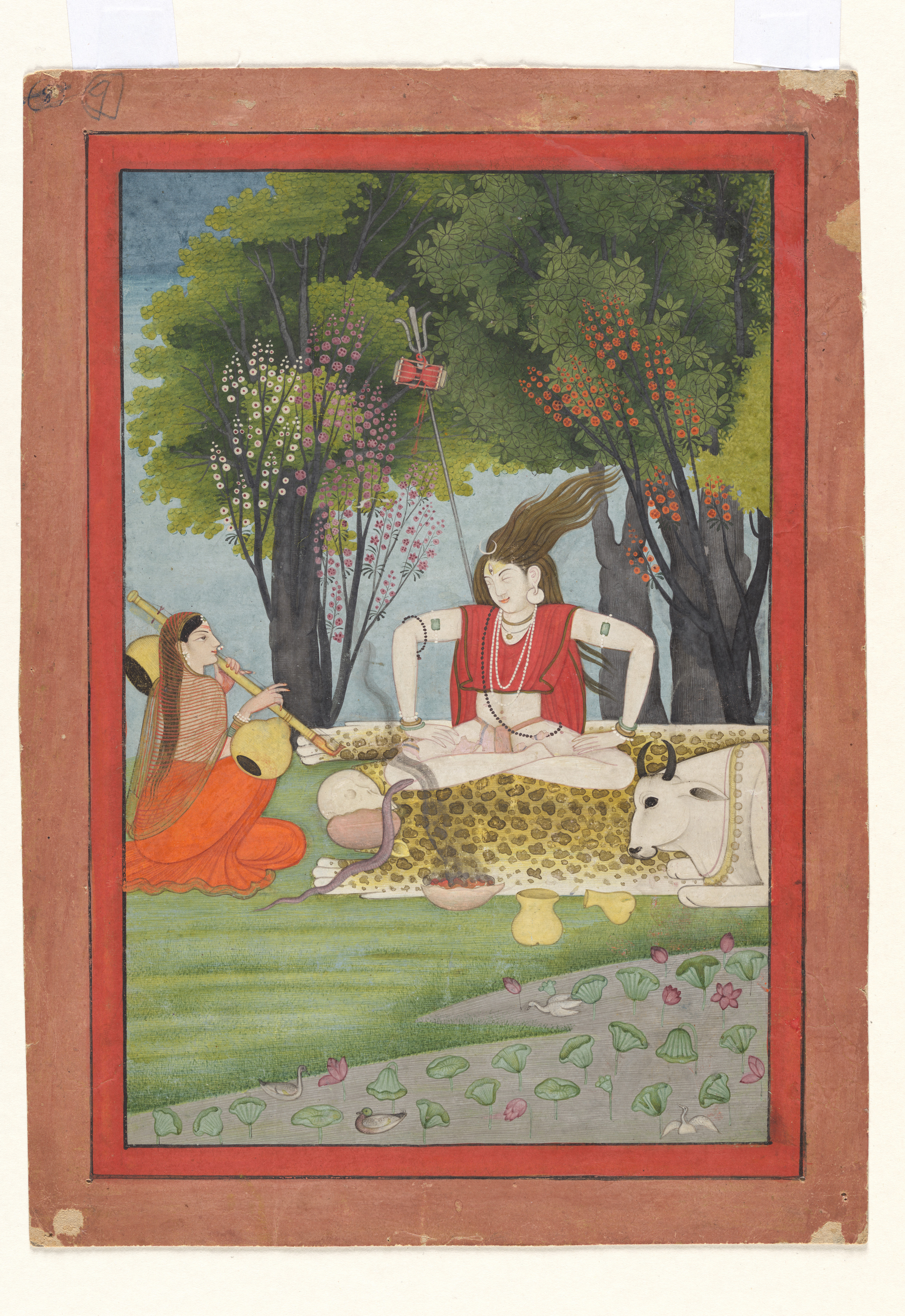
A meditating Shiva is visited by Parvati

Tantric yoga is first and foremost an embodied practice, which is seen as having a divine esoteric structure. As noted by Padoux, tantric yoga makes use of a "mystic physiology" which includes various psychosomatic elements known as the subtle body. This imaginary inner structure includes chakras ("wheels"), nadis ("channels"), and energies (like Kundalini, Chandali, different pranas and vital winds, etc.).

The tantric body is held to be a microcosmic reflection of the universe, and is thus seen as containing gods and goddesses. According to Padoux, the "internalized image of the yogic body" is a fundamental element for nearly all meditative and tantric ritual practices.

The use of mantras is one of the most common and widespread elements of tantric practice. They are used in rituals as well as during various meditative and yogic practices. Mantra recitation (japa) is often practiced along with nyasa ("depositing" the mantra), mudras ("seals", i.e. hand gestures) and complex visualizations involving divine symbols, mandalas and deities. Nyasa involves touching various parts of the body while reciting mantra, which is thought to connect the deity with the yogis body and transform the body into that of the deity.

Mantras are also often visualized as being located within the yogi's body as part of tantric meditations. For example, in the "Yogini Heart" tantra, a Śrī Vidyā text, the yogi is instructed to imagine the five syllables (HA SA KA LA HRIM) of the deity's mantra in the muladhara chakra. The next set of five syllables (HA SA KA HA LA HRIM) is visualized in the heart chakra and the third cluster (SA KA LA HRIM) in the cakra between the eyebrows. The yogi is further instructed to lengthen the enunciation of the M sound at the end of the HRIM syllable, a practice called nada (phonic vibration). This practice goes through various increasingly subtle stages until it dissolves into the silence of the Absolute.

Another common element found in tantric yoga is the use of visionary meditations in which tantrikas focus on a vision or image of the deity (or deities), and in some cases imagine themselves as being the deity and their own body as the body of the deity. The practitioner may use visualizations, identifying with a deity to the degree that the aspirant becomes the Ishta-deva (or meditational deity). In other meditations, the deities are visualized as being inside the tantrika's body. For example, in Abhinavagupta's Tantraloka (chapter 15), the Trika trinity of goddesses (Parā, Parāparā, and Aparā) are visualized on the ends of the three prongs of a trident (located above the head). The rest of the trident is imagined positioned along the central axis of the yogi's body, with the blazing corpse of Shiva visualized in the head.

=== Mandalas and yantras ===
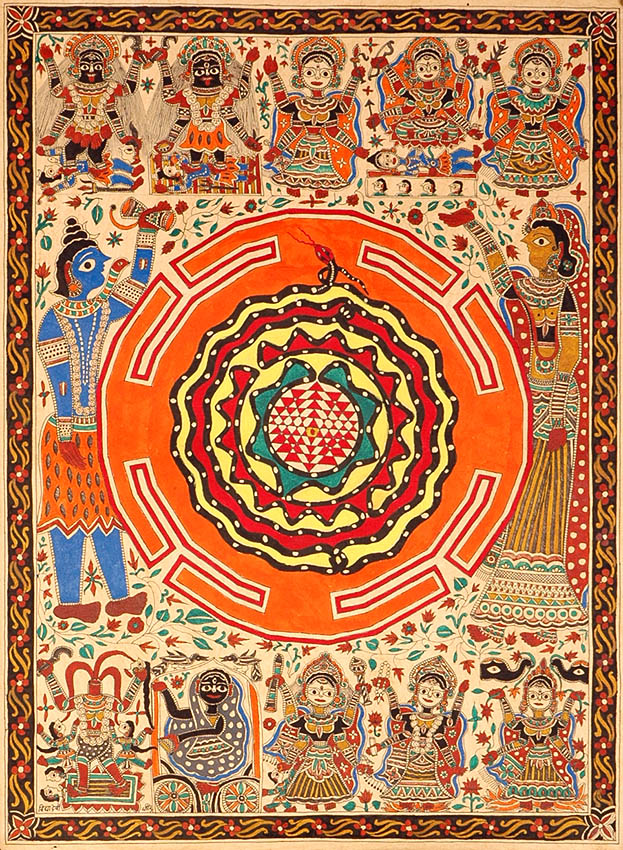
Sri Yantra diagram with the Ten Mahavidyas. The triangles represent Shiva and Shakti; the snake represents Spanda and Kundalini.

Yantra are mystical diagrams which are used in tantric meditation and ritual. They are usually associated with specific Hindu deities such as Shiva, Shakti, or Kali. Similarly, a puja may involve focusing on a yantra or mandala associated with a deity.

According to David Gordon White, geometrical mandalas are a key element of Tantra. They are used to represent numerous tantric ideas and concepts as well as used for meditative focus. Mandalas symbolically communicate the correspondences between the "transcendent-yet-immanent" macrocosm and the microcosm of mundane human experience.

The godhead (or principal Buddha) is often depicted at the center of the mandala, while all other beings, including the practitioner, are located at various distances from this center. Mandalas also reflected the medieval feudal system, with the king at its centre.

Mandalas and Yantras may be depicted in various ways, on paintings, cloth, in three dimensional form, made out of colored sand or powders, etc. Tantric yoga also often involves the mental visualization of a mandala or yantra. This is usually combined with mantra recitation and other ritual actions as part of a tantric sadhana (practice).

=== Sex and eroticism ===
While tantra involves a wide range of ideas and practices which are not always of a sexual nature, Flood and Padoux both note that in the West, Tantra is most often thought of as a kind of ritualized sex or a spiritualized yogic sexuality. According to Padoux, "this is a misunderstanding, for though the place of sex in Tantra is ideologically essential, it is not always so in action and ritual." Padoux further notes that while sexual practices do exist and were used by certain tantric groups, they "lost their prevalence when Tantra spread to other larger social groups."

In the tantric traditions which do use sex as part of spiritual practice (this refers mainly to the Kaulas, and also Tibetan Buddhism), sex and desire are often seen as a means of transcendence that is used to reach the Absolute. Thus, sex and desire are not seen as ends in themselves. Because these practices transgress orthodox Hindu ideas of ritual purity, they have often given tantra a bad image in India, where it is often condemned by the orthodox. According to Padoux, even among the traditions which accept these practices, they are far from prominent and practiced only by a "few initiated and fully qualified adepts".

=== Diksha ===
The main element of all Shaiva Tantra is the practice of diksha, a ceremonial initiation in which divinely revealed mantras are given to the initiate by a Guru.

== Western scholarly research ==
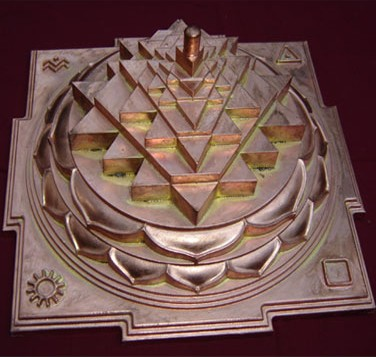
The Sri Yantra (shown here in the three-dimensional projection known as Sri Meru or Maha Meru, used primarily by Srividya Shakta sects)

=== John Woodroffe ===
The first Western scholar to seriously study Tantra was John Woodroffe (1865–1936), who wrote about Tantra under the pen name Arthur Avalon and is known as the "founding father of Tantric studies". Unlike previous Western scholars Woodroffe advocated for Tantra, defending and presenting it as an ethical and philosophical system in accord with the Vedas and Vedanta. Woodroffe practised Tantra and, while trying to maintain scholastic objectivity, was a student of Hindu Tantra (the Shiva-Shakta tradition).

=== Further development ===
Following Woodroffe, a number of scholars began investigating Tantric teachings, including scholars of comparative religion and Indology such as Agehananda Bharati, Mircea Eliade, Julius Evola, Carl Jung, Alexandra David-Néel, Giuseppe Tucci and Heinrich Zimmer. According to Hugh Urban, Zimmer, Evola and Eliade viewed Tantra as "the culmination of all Indian thought: the most radical form of spirituality and the archaic heart of aboriginal India", regarding it as the ideal religion for the modern era. All three saw Tantra as "the most transgressive and violent path to the sacred".

== See also ==
- Dzogchen
- Radha Tantra

== Sources ==
- Avalon, Arthur (1913). Tantra of the Great Liberation: Mahanirvana Tantra. London: Luzac & Co.
- Avalon, Arthur (1914). Principles of Tantra: the Tantratattva of Shriyukta Shiva Chandra Vidyarnava Bhattacharyya Mahodaya. London: Luzac & Co.
- Avalon, Arthur (1918). Sakti and Sakta. Essays and Addresses on the Tantra Shastra. London: Luzac and Co.
- Bagchi, P. C. (1989). Evolution of the Tantras, Studies on the Tantras (2nd rev. ed.). Kolkata: Ramakrishna Mission Institute of Culture. ISBN 978-81-85843-36-0.
- Bagchi, P. C. (2017). "Evolution of the Tantras". Studies On the Tantras. India: Ramakrishna Math. ISBN 978-8187332770.
- Banerjee, Sures Chandra (1988). A Brief History of Tantra Literature. Kolkata: Naya Prokash.
- Banerjee, Sures Chandra (2002). Companion to Tantra. Abhinav Publications. ISBN 978-1-70174-022-8.
- Barrett, Ron (2008). Aghor Medicin. University of California Press. p. 12. ISBN 978-0-520-25218-9.
- Beer, Robert (2003). The Handbook of Tibetan Buddhist Symbols. Serindia Publications. ISBN 978-1-932476-03-3.
- Berkson, Carmel (1986). The caves at Aurangabad: early Buddhist Tantric art in India. Mapin. ISBN 9780295964621.
- Bhattacharyya, N. N. (1999). History of the Tantric Religion (2nd rev. ed.). New Delhi: Manohar. ISBN 978-81-7304-025-2.
- Bisschop, Peter C. (2020). "1. From Mantramārga Back to Atimārga: Atimārga as a Self referential Term". In Goodall at al. (ed.). Śaivism and the Tantric Traditions: Essays in Honour of Alexis G.J.S. Sanderson. Indological Studies, vol. 22. Gonda. ISBN 978-9004432666.
- Borkataky-Varma, S. (January 2019). "Red: An Ethnographic Study of Cross-Pollination Between the Vedic and the Tantric". International Journal of Hindu Studies. 23 (2): 179–194. doi:10.1007/s11407-019-09258-z. JSTOR 48703461.
- Brooks, Douglas Renfrew (1990). The Secret of the Three Cities: An Introduction to Hindu Sakta Tantrism. University of Chicago Press. ISBN 978-0-226-07569-3.
- Brown, Robert. Introduction. In Harper & Brown (2002), pp. 1–15.
- Cavendish, Richard (1980). The Great Religions. Arco Publishing.
- Cort, John E. (2001). David Gordon White (ed.). Tantra in Practice. Motilal Banarsidass. ISBN 978-81-208-1778-4.
- Dahiya, Poonam Dalal (2017). Ancient and Medieval India. McGraw-Hill Education. ISBN 978-93-5260-673-3.
- Dalton, J. (2004). "The Development of Perfection: The Interiorization of Buddhist Ritual in the Eight and Ninth Centuries". Journal of Indian Philosophy. 32: 1–30. doi:10.1023/B:INDI.0000014015.64305.30. S2CID 170547474.
- Davidson, Ronald M. (2004). Indian Esoteric Buddhism: A Social History of the Tantric Movement. New York: Columbia University Press. ISBN 978-81-208-1991-7.
- Davis, Richard (2014). Ritual in an Oscillating Universe: Worshipping Siva in Medieval India. Princeton University Press. ISBN 978-0-691-60308-7.
- Deussen, Paul (1980). Sixty Upanishads of the Veda, Volume 1. Motilal Banarsidass. ISBN 978-8120814684.
- Dyczkowski, Mark S. G. (1988). The Canon of the Saivagama and the Kubjika: Tantras of the Western Kaula Tradition. SUNY Press. ISBN 978-0-88706-494-4.
- Dyczkowski, Mark S. G. (1989). The Doctrine of Vibration: An Analysis of the Doctrines and Practices of Kashmir Shaivism. Motilal Banarsidass. ISBN 978-81-208-0596-5.
- Einoo, Shingo, ed. (2009). Genesis and Development of Tantrism. University of Tokyo.
- Felch, Susan M. (2016). The Cambridge Companion to Literature and Religion. Cambridge University Press. ISBN 978-1-316-75726-0.
- Feuerstein, Georg (1998). Tantra: The Path of Ecstasy. Shambhala Publications.
- Feuerstein, Georg (2001). The Yoga Tradition: Its History, Literature, Philosophy and Practice. Hohm Press. ISBN 978-1890772185.
- Feuerstein, Georg (2011). The Bhagavad-Gita, A New Translation. Boston & London: Shambhala. ISBN 978-1-59030-893-6.
- Flood, Gavin D. (1996). An Introduction to Hinduism. Cambridge University Press. ISBN 978-0-521-43878-0.
- Flood, Gavin (2006). The Tantric Body, The Secret Tradition of Hindu Religion. I.B. Taurus. ISBN 978-1-84511-011-6.
- Fraser-Lu, Sylvia; Stadtner, Donald M. (2015). Buddhist Art of Myanmar. Yale University Press. ISBN 978-0-300-20945-7.
- Ghose, Rajeshwari (1996). The Tyāgarāja Cult in Tamilnāḍu: A Study in Conflict and Accommodation. Motilal Banarsidass Publications. ISBN 81-208-1391-X.
- Goble, Geoffrey C. (2019). Chinese Esoteric Buddhism: Amoghavajra, the Ruling Elite, and the Emergence of a Tradition. New York. ISBN 978-0-231-55064-2. OCLC 1099543349.
- Goudriaan, Teun (1981). Teun Goudriaan; Sanjukta Gupta (eds.). Hindu Tantric and Śākta Literature. Otto Harrassowitz Verlag. ISBN 978-3-447-02091-6.
- Gough, Ellen (2012). "Shades of Enlightenment: A Jain Tantric Diagram and the Colours of the Tirthankaras". International Journal of Jaina Studies. 8 (1): 1–47.
- Grassi, Luigi; Riba, Michelle, eds. (2014). Psychopharmacology in Oncology and Palliative Care: A Practical Manual. Germany: Springer Berlin Heidelberg. ISBN 978-3642401343.
- Gray, David B. (5 April 2016). "Tantra and the Tantric Traditions of Hinduism and Buddhism". Oxford Research Encyclopedia of Religion. Oxford: Oxford University Press. doi:10.1093/acrefore/9780199340378.013.59. ISBN 9780199340378. Archived from the original on 8 December 2018.
- Gray, David B.; Overbey, Ryan Richard (2016). Tantric Traditions in Transmission and Translation. Oxford University Press. ISBN 978-0-19-990952-0.
- Gray, David B. (2023). The Buddhist Tantras: A Guide. Oxford University Press. ISBN 978-0-19-762383-1.
- Harper, Katherine Anne; Brown, Robert L., eds. (2002). The Roots of Tantra. State University of New York Press. ISBN 978-0-7914-5306-3.
- Harper, Katherine Anne; Brown, Robert L., eds. (2012). The Roots of Tantra. State University of New York Press. ISBN 978-0-7914-8890-4.
- Hirakawa, Akira; Groner, Paul (2007). A History of Indian Buddhism: From Śākyamuni to Early Mahāyāna. pp. 125–126.
- Joshi, Lal Mani (1977). Studies in the Buddhistic Culture of India During the 7th and 8th Centuries A.D. Motilal Banarsidass. ISBN 978-81-208-0281-0.
- Joshi, M. C. "Historical and Iconographic Aspects of Śākta Tantrism". In Harper & Brown (2012), pp. 39–56.
- Kangle, R. P. (1986). The Kautiliya Arthasastra. Motilal Banarsidass. ISBN 978-81-208-0042-7.
- Keul, István (2012). Transformations and Transfer of Tantra in Asia and Beyond. Walter de Gruyter. ISBN 978-3-11-025811-0.
- Kongtrul, Jamgon (2005). The Treasury of Knowledge, Book Six, Part Four Systems of Buddhist Tantra. Translated by Guarisco, Elio; McLeod, Ingrid. Snow Lion Publications. p. 74.
- Lewis, Todd; deAngelis, Gary (2016). Teaching Buddhism: New Insights on Understanding and Presenting the Traditions. Oxford University Press. ISBN 978-0-19-937309-3.
- Lidke, Jeff (8 February 2004). "The transmission of all powers: Sarvāmnāya Śākta Tantra and the semiotics of power in Nepāla-maṇḍala". The Pacific World. 6: 257–291.
- Lidke, Jeffrey (12 March 2021). "The Journey to the Summit: Kuṇḍaliṇī's Ascent through Initiation into the Revelations of the Sarvāmnāya Tantra of Nepal". Embodied Philosophy.
- Lorea, Carola Erika (25 May 2018). "'I Am Afraid of Telling You This, Lest You'd Be Scared Shitless!': The Myth of Secrecy and the Study of the Esoteric Traditions of Bengal". Religions. 9 (6): 172. doi:10.3390/rel9060172.
- Lorenzen, David N. (1972). The Kāpālikas and Kālāmukhas: Two Lost Śaivite Sects. University of California Press. ISBN 978-0-520-01842-6.
- Lorenzen, David N. "Early Evidence for Tantric Religion". In Harper & Brown (2002).
- Lye, Hun Yeow (2003). Feeding Ghosts: A Study of the Yuqie Yankou Rite (PhD dissertation). University of Virginia. doi:10.18130/v3s82z.
- Mallinson, James (2016). "The Amrtasiddhi: Hathayoga's tantric Buddhist source text". Śaivism and the Tantric Traditions. SOAS, University of London: 409.
- Mallinson, James (2019). "Kalavañcana in the Konkan: How a Vajrayana Hathayoga Tradition Cheated Buddhism's Death in India". Religions. 10 (4): 1–33. doi:10.3390/rel10040273.
- Monier-Williams, Sir Monier; Leumann, Ernst; Cappeller, Carl (2002) [1899]. A Sanskrit-English Dictionary: Etymologically and Philologically Arranged with Special Reference to Cognate Indo-European Languages (reprint of OUP ed.). Motilal Banarsidass. p. 436. ISBN 978-81-208-3105-6.
- Olivelle, Patrick (1992). The Samnyasa Upanisads. Oxford University Press. ISBN 978-0-19-507045-3.
- Olivelle, Patrick (1993). The Aśrama System: The History and Hermeneutics of a Religious Institution. Oxford University Press. ISBN 978-0-19-534478-3 – via Archive.org.
- Olivelle, Patrick (2011). Ascetics and Brahmins studies in ideologies and institutions. London New York: Anthem Press. ISBN 978-0-85728-432-7.
- Orzech, Charles D. (1989). "Seeing Chen-Yen Buddhism: Traditional Scholarship and the Vajrayāna in China". History of Religions. 29 (2): 87–114. doi:10.1086/463182. ISSN 0018-2710. JSTOR 1062679. S2CID 162235701.
- Orzech, Charles; Sørensen, Henrik; Payne, Richard (2011). Esoteric Buddhism and the Tantras in East Asia. Brill Academic. ISBN 978-90-04-18491-6.
- Osto, Douglas (June 2009). "'Proto–Tantric' Elements in the Gandavyuha Sutra". Journal of Religious History. 33 (2): 165–177. doi:10.1111/j.1467-9809.2009.00792.x.
- Padoux, André. "What Do We Mean by Tantrism?". In Harper & Brown (2002).
- Padoux, André (2013). The Heart of the Yogini. Oxford: Oxford University Press. ISBN 978-1-2999-4016-1.
- Padoux, André (2017). The Hindu Tantric World An Overview. Chicago: University of Chicago Press. ISBN 978-0226424095.
- Payne, Richard K., ed. (2006). Tantric Buddhism in East Asia. Simon and Schuster. ISBN 978-0-86171-487-2.
- Phillips, Stephen (2009). Yoga, Karma, and Rebirth: A Brief History and Philosophy. Columbia University Press. ISBN 978-0-231-14485-8.
- Pontillo, Tiziana; Candotti, Maria Piera (2014). Signless Signification in Ancient India and Beyond. Anthem Press. ISBN 978-1-78308-332-9.
- Rinehart, Robin (2011). Debating the Dasam Granth. Oxford University Press. ISBN 978-0-19-975506-6.
- Samuel, Geoffrey (2010). The Origins of Yoga and Tantra. Indic Religions to the Thirteenth Century. Cambridge University Press.
- Samuel, Geoffrey; Johnston, Jay, eds. (2013). Religion and the Subtle Body in Asia and the West: Between Mind and Body. Routledge. ISBN 978-1-136-76640-4.
- Sanderson, Alexis (1988). "Saivism and the Tantric Traditions". In S Sutherland; et al. (eds.). The World's Religions. Routledge.
- Sanderson, Alexis (1995). Vajrayāna: Origin and Function. Buddhism into the Year 2000. International Conference Proceedings. Bangkok and Los Angeles: Dhammakāya Foundation. pp. 89–102.
- Sanderson, Alexis (2009). "The Śaiva Age: The Rise and Dominance of Śaivism during the Early Medieval Period". In Shingo Einoo (ed.). Genesis and Development of Tantrism. Tokyo: Institute of Oriental Culture.
- Sanderson, Alexis (2010). Dominic Goodall & Andre Padoux (ed.). Mélanges tantriques à la mémoire d'Hélène Brunner: Tantric Studies in Memory of Hélène Brunner. Institut Français de Pondichéry. ISBN 978-2855396668.
- Sanderson, Alexis (2012–2013). "The Śaiva Literature" (PDF). Journal of Indological Studies (Kyoto). No. 24 & 25. pp. 1–113. Archived from the original (PDF) on 2 October 2015.
- Scharfe, Hartmut (1977). Grammatical Literature. Otto Harrassowitz. ISBN 978-3-447-01706-0.
- Sharf, Robert H. (2002). Coming to Terms with Chinese Buddhism: A Reading of the Treasure Store Treatise. Honolulu: University of Hawai'i Press. ISBN 0-8248-2443-1. OCLC 53119548.
- Sharma, D. S. (1990). The Philosophy of Sadhana. State University of New York Press. ISBN 978-0-7914-0347-1.
- Smith, Brian K. (2005). "Tantrism: Hindu Tantrism". In Jones, Lindsay (ed.). MacMillan Encyclopedia of Religion. MacMillan.
- Smith, David (1996). The Dance of Siva: Religion, Art and Poetry in South India. Cambridge University Press. ISBN 978-0-521-48234-9.
- Smith, Frederick M. (2012). The Self Possessed: Deity and Spirit Possession in South Asian Literature and Civilization. Columbia University Press. ISBN 978-0-231-51065-3.
- Snellgrove, David (1987). Indo-Tibetan Buddhism: Indian Buddhists and their Tibetan successors. Orchid Press. ISBN 978-9745240131.
- Solonin, K. J. (2013). "Buddhist Connections between the Liao and Xixia: Preliminary Considerations". Journal of Song-Yuan Studies. 43: 171–219. ISSN 1059-3152. JSTOR 43855194.
- Stirling, Isabel (2006). Zen Pioneer: The Life & Works of Ruth Fuller Sasaki. Counterpoint. ISBN 978-1593761707.
- Taddei, Maurizio (1979). "The story of the Buddha and the skull-tapper: A Note on Gandharan Iconography". Annali Sezione Orientale. 39 (3): 395–420.
- Urban, Hugh B. (2003). Tantra: Sex, Secrecy, Politics, and Power in the Study of Religions. University of California Press. ISBN 978-0-520-23656-1.
- Urban, Hugh B. Urban (2008) [2003]. Tantra: Sex, Secrecy, Politics, and Power in the Study of Religion. Motilal Banarsidass. ISBN 978-81-208-2932-9.
- Vasugupta (1992). The Aphorisms of Siva: The Siva Sutra with Bhaskara's Commentary, the Varttika. Translated by Mark Dyczkowski. State University of New York Press. ISBN 978-0-7914-1264-0.
- Wallis, Christopher (2012). Tantra Illuminated. Anusara Press. ISBN 978-1937104016.
- Wallis, Christopher (February 2016). "The Tantric Age: A comparison of Shaiva and Buddhist Tantra". Sutra Journal.
- Watson, Burton (trans) (1994). "Chapter Twenty-six: Dharani". Lotus Sutra. Columbia University Press. ISBN 978-0231081610.
- Wedemeyer, Christian K. (2013). Making Sense of Tantric Buddhism: History, Semiology, and Transgression in the Indian Traditions. Columbia University Press. pp. 155, 252.
- Werner, Karel (1977). "Yoga and the Ṛg Veda: An Interpretation of the Keśin Hymn (RV 10, 136)". Religious Studies. 13 (3): 289–302. doi:10.1017/S0034412500010076. S2CID 170592174.
- White, David Gordon, ed. (2000). Tantra in Practice. Princeton University Press. ISBN 978-0-691-05779-8.
- White, David Gordon (2003). Kiss of the Yogini: "Tantric Sex" in its South Asian Contexts. University of Chicago Press. ISBN 978-0-226-02783-8.
- White, David Gordon (2005). "Tantrism: An Overview". In Jones, Lindsay (ed.). MacMillan Encyclopedia of Religion. MacMillan.
- White, David Gordon (2014). The "Yoga Sutra of Patanjali": A Biography. Princeton University Press. ISBN 978-1-4008-5005-1.
- Williams, Paul; Tribe, Anthony (2000). Buddhist Thought. Routledge.
- Willemen, Charles (2004). The Chinese Hevajratantra: the scriptural text of the Ritual of the Great King of the Teaching, the Adamantine One with Great Compassion and Knowledge of the Void. Delhi: Motilal Banarsidass Publishers. ISBN 81-208-1945-4. OCLC 60383600.
