= Kaunghmudaw Pagoda =

Notable Buddhist Pagoda in Sagaing, Myanmar

Yaza Mani Sula Kaunghmudaw
- ရာဇမဏိစူဠာ ကောင်းမှုတော် Rājamaṇicūḷā
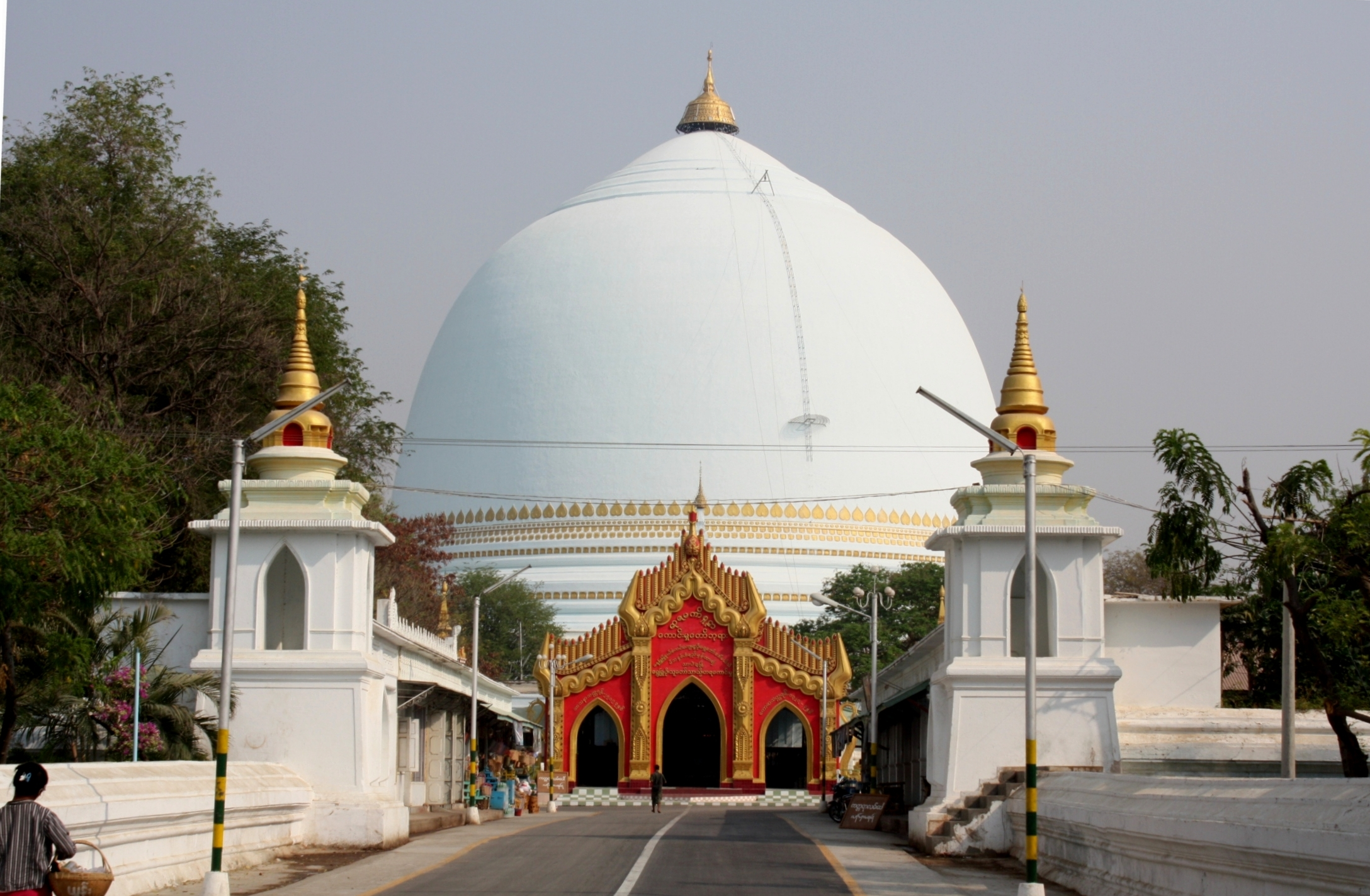

- Location within Myanmar

Religion
- Affiliation: Theravada Buddhism

Location
- Country: Myanmar
- Coordinates: 21°55′57.92″N 95°56′16.63″E

Architecture
- Founder: Thalun
- Completed: 23 July 1636; 12 May 1648 (completed)

The Kaunghmudaw Pagoda (Burmese: ကောင်းမှုတော် ဘုရား [káʊɰ̃ m̥ṵ dɔ́ pʰəjá]; Yaza Mani Sula Kaunghmudaw (ရာဇမဏိစူဠာ ကောင်းမှုတော်); Pali: Rājamaṇicūḷā) is a large Buddhist pagoda on the northwestern outskirts of Sagaing in central Myanmar (Burma). Modeled after the Ruwanwelisaya pagoda of Sri Lanka, the Kaunghmudaw is known for its egg-shaped design, which stands out among more traditional-style, pyramid-shaped Burmese pagodas. The stupa's formal name Yaza Mani Sula signifies the enshrinement of Buddhist relics inside its relic chamber, but it is commonly known by its popular name, Kaunghmudaw (lit. 'Royal Merit-Making'). It is an important pilgrimage and tourist destination in the Sagaing area.

== Construction ==
Construction began during the reign of King Thalun on 25 April 1636 (Friday, 8th waning of Kason 998 ME). The pagoda's relic chamber was dedicated on 23 July 1636 (Wednesday, 7th waning of 2nd Waso 998). The pagoda was completed 12 years later on 12 May 1648 (Tuesday, 6th waning of Kason 1010) towards the end of Thalun's reign.

== Architecture ==
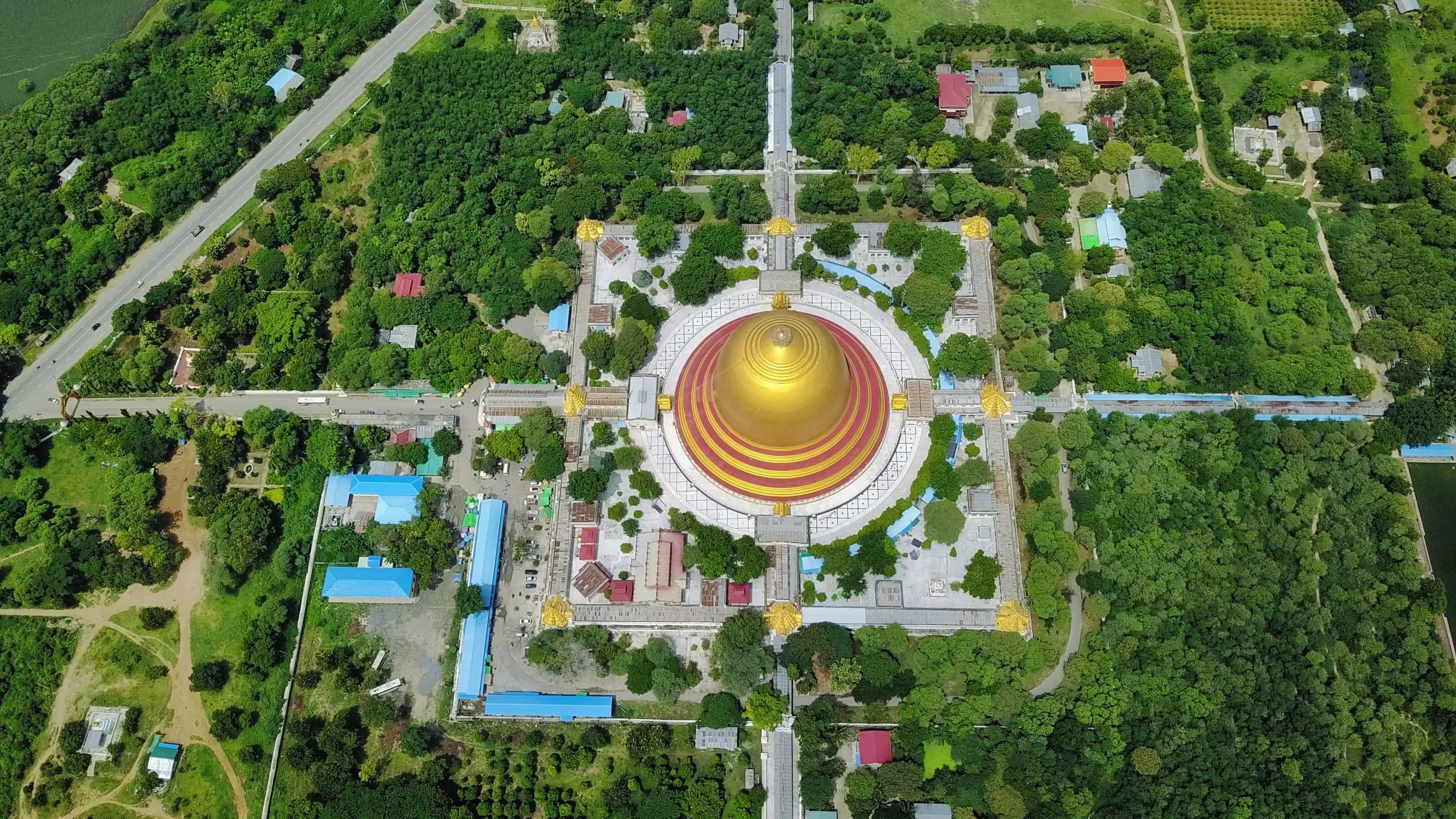
Aerial view of Kaunghmudaw Pagoda

The pagoda is 46 metres (151 ft) high and has a circumference of 274 metres (899 ft). The hti (umbrella or crowning) of the pagoda is 7.92 metres (26.0 ft) high and weighs 3.5 kilograms (7.7 lb) (3440 viss). The pagoda differs from the traditional Burmese-style pyramidal structures by having an arched image chamber in the center of its base. The chamber houses a massive seated 7.3 metres (24 ft)-high Buddha statue, carved out of solid white marble. The head of the Buddha statue alone is about 2.4 metres (7 ft 10 in) in diameter. It is believed that the dome was built later around the massive statue.

The lowest terrace of the pagoda is decorated with 120 nats and devas. It is ringed by 802 stone lanterns, carved with inscriptions of Buddha's life in three languages: Burmese, Mon and Shan, representing the three main regions of the Restored Toungoo Kingdom.

The pagoda dome has been continuously painted white to signify purity, in Ceylonese tradition.

According to local lore, the relic chamber of the pagoda contains the lower left tooth relic of the Buddha, 11 hair relics, an alms bowl, statues, pagodas and other relics.

== Controversy ==
The military government of Burma has initiated a project to paint the dome with gold paint, which has drawn criticism from some locals and other Burmese.

== See also ==
- Sagaing
- Mingun Pahtodawgyi
- Hsinphyumae Pagoda
