= Pon Daw Pagoda =

Pagoda in Sagaing Region, Myanmar

Coordinates: 22°02′55.9″N 96°01′10.8″E

Pondaw Pagoda
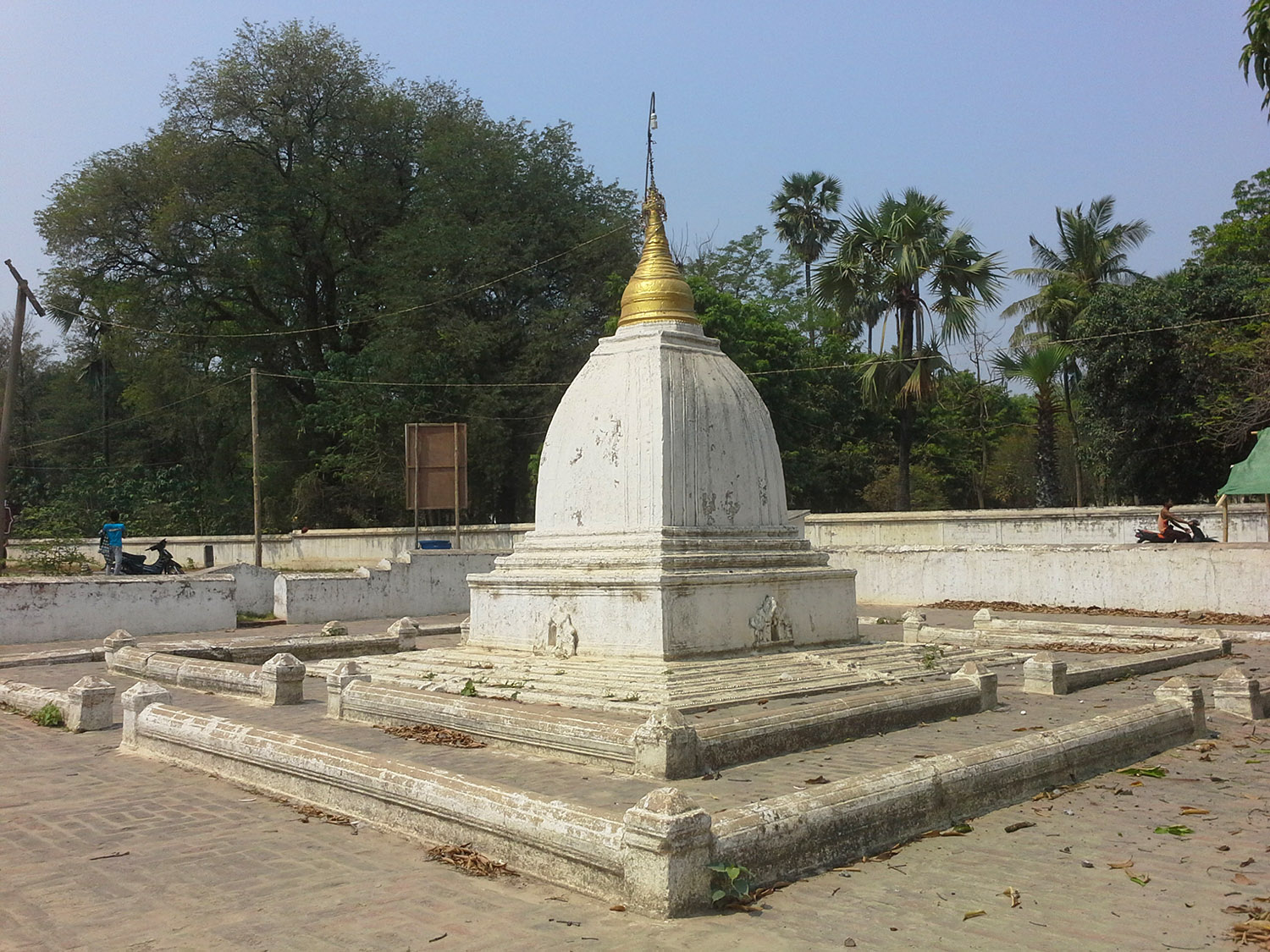

Religion
- Affiliation: Buddhism
- Sect: Theravada Buddhism
- Region: Sagaing Region
- Status: active

Location
- Location: Mingun, Myanmar
- Country: Myanmar
- Interactive map of Pondaw Pagoda

Architecture
- Established: 1799

The Pon Daw Pagoda (Burmese: ပုံတော်စေတီ) is a small pagoda in Mingun, Myanmar. Built in 1799, the temple is a miniature version of the larger, incomplete Mingun Pahtodawgyi in Mingun, which was abandoned due to cost overruns. The Paw Daw Pagoda resembles what the Pahtodawgyi was intended to look like when it was complete.
