= Settawya Pagoda =

Buddhist temple in Sagaing Region, Myanmar

Coordinates: 22°02′58.5″N 96°00′37.4″E

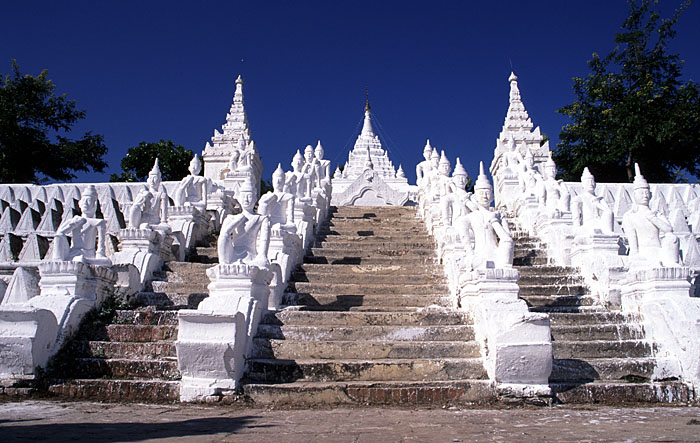

Religion
- Affiliation: Buddhism
- Sect: Theravada Buddhism
- Region: Sagaing Region
- Status: active

Location
- Location: Mingun, Myanmar
- Country: Myanmar
- Interactive map of Settawya Pagoda

Architecture
- Groundbreaking: 1804
- Completed: 1811

The Settawya Pagoda is a Buddhist temple in Mingun, Myanmar. Built in the early 19th century at the behest of King Bodawpaya Konbaung, it is one of several prominent pagodas in Mingun; the structure at Settawya was built during the same time as the larger-yet-uncompleted Mingun Pahtodawgyi, which was also built on the orders of Bodawpaya. The stark-white Settwaya Pagoda is located several hundred feet from the Irrawaddy River, and the temple contains a marble footprint of the Buddha.

The structure of the pagoda sustained some damage during a major earthquake in 1839; its interior has since been reinforced against future earthquakes.
