= Hsinbyume Pagoda =

Large pagoda on the northern side of Mingun in Sagaing Region in Myanmar

ဆင်ဖြူမယ် မြသိန်းတန်စေတီ Hsinbyume Myatheindan Pagoda
- ဆင်ဖြူမယ် မြသိန်းတန် စေတီ
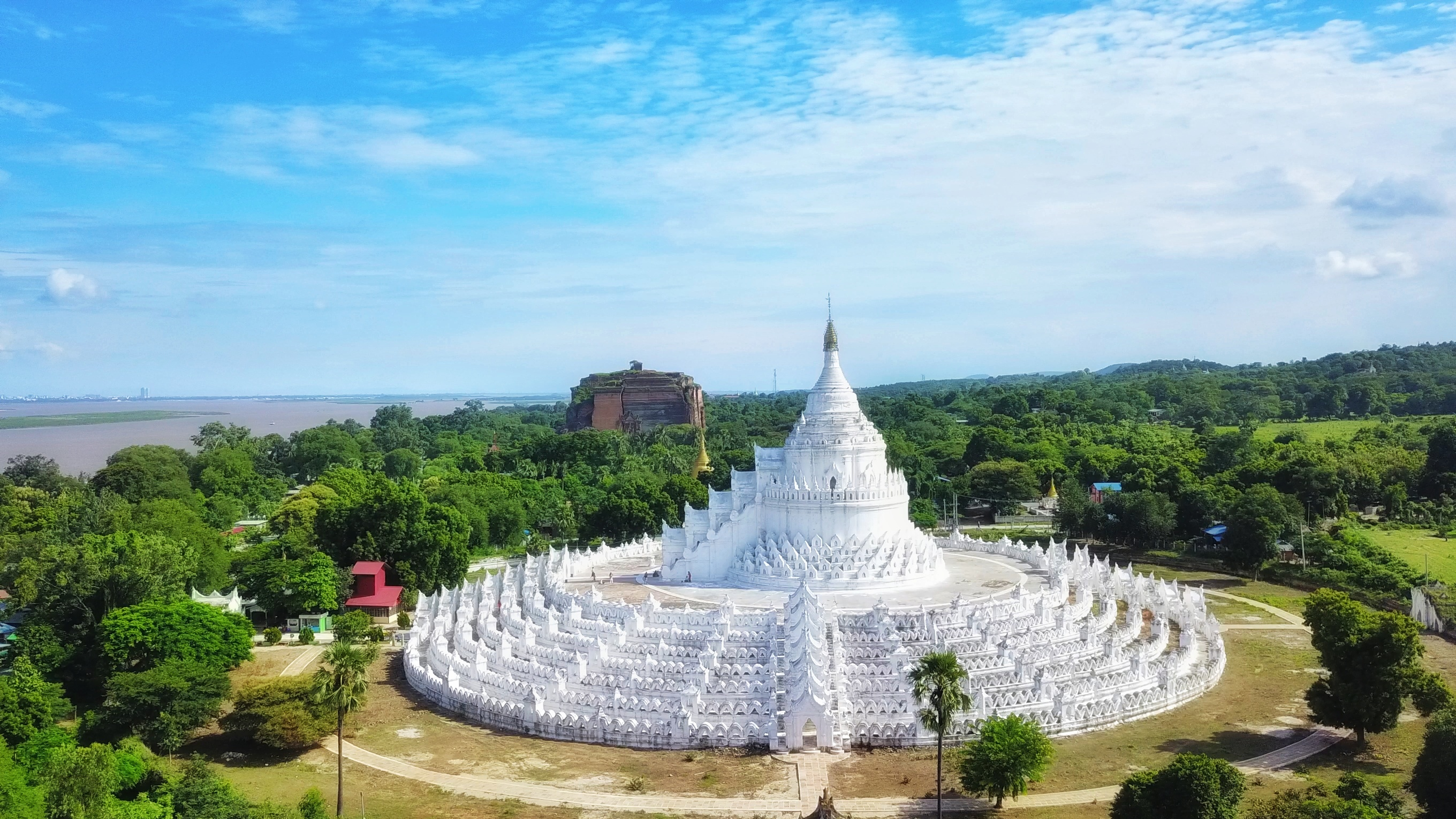

- Location within Myanmar

Religion
- Affiliation: Theravada Buddhism

Location
- Location: Mingun, Sagaing Region
- Country: Myanmar
- Coordinates: 22°03′20″N 96°00′59″E

Architecture
- Founder: King Bagyidaw
- Completed: 1816; 210 years ago

The Hsinbyume Pagoda (Burmese: ဆင်ဖြူမယ်စေတီ [sʰɪ̀ɰ̃ pʰjù mɛ̀ zèdì]), also known as Myatheindan Pagoda (မြသိန်းတန်စေတီ [mja̰ θéɪɰ̃ dàɰ̃ zèdì]), is a large pagoda on the northern side of Mingun in Sagaing Region, Myanmar, on the western bank of the Irrawaddy River. It is approximately 10 kilometres (6.2 mi) northwest of Mandalay and is located in the proximity of the Mingun Pahtodawgyi. The pagoda is painted white and is modelled on the physical description of the Buddhist sacred mountain, Mount Meru.

== Construction ==
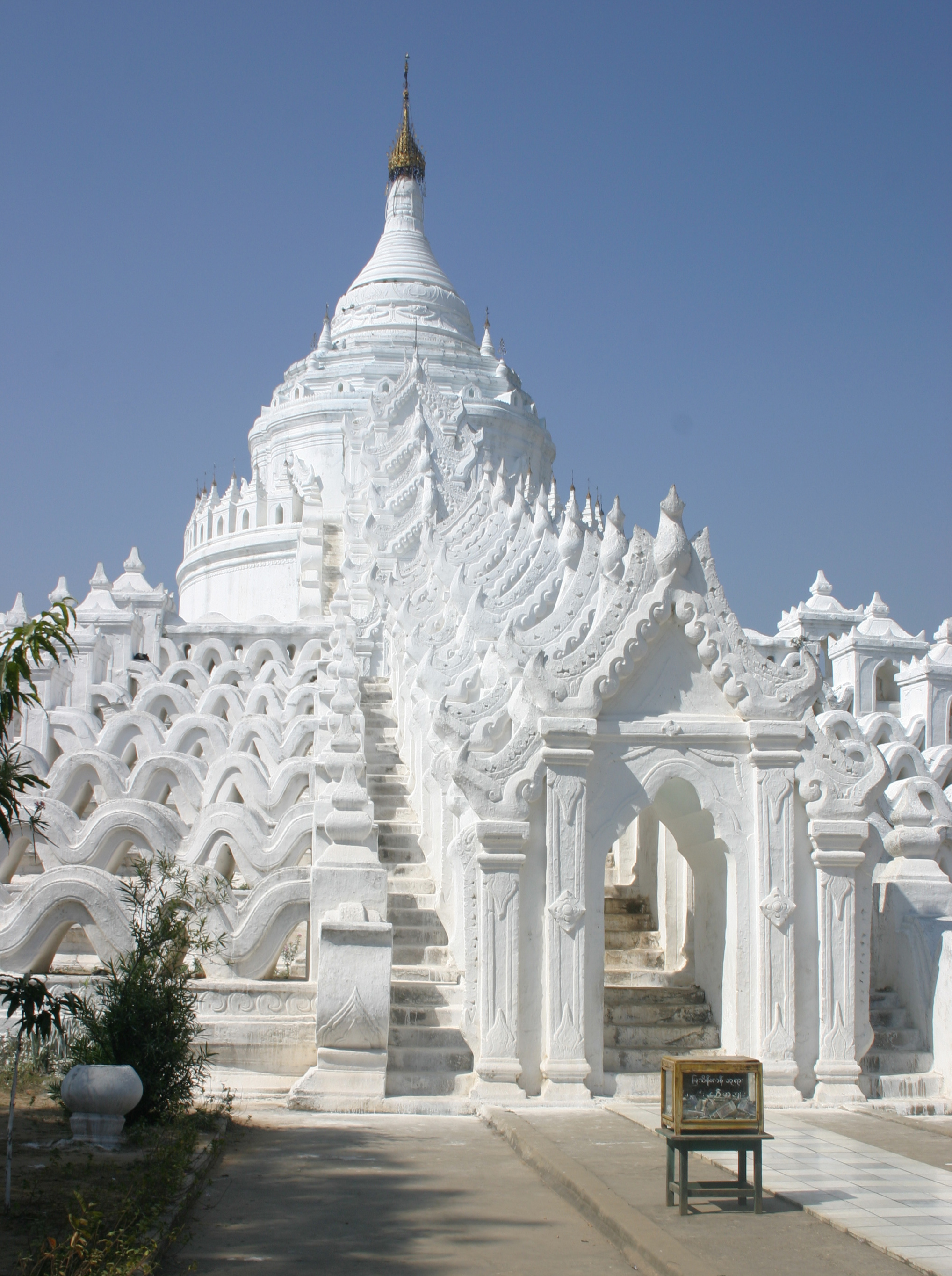
Hsinbyume Pagoda, Mingun

The pagoda was built in 1816 by Bagyidaw. It is dedicated to the memory of his first consort and cousin, Princess Hsinbyume (ဆင်ဖြူမယ်, lit. Princess White Elephant, 1789–1812) who had died in childbirth at a site nearby.

== Design ==
The pagoda's design is a great departure from Burmese pagoda design norms. It is based on descriptions of the mythical Sulamani pagoda on Mount Meru, and the lower parts of the pagoda represent the mountain. Seven concentric terraces represent the seven mountain ranges going up to Mount Meru according to Buddhist mythology.

== Earthquakes and restoration ==
The pagoda was badly damaged by an earthquake in 1839 and was restored by King Mindon in 1874.

The pagoda was again badly damaged during the 2025 Myanmar earthquake, with most of the structure collapsing.

== See also ==
- Mingun
- Mingun Pahtodawgyi
- Bagyidaw
