= Mount Meru =

Sacred mountain of Hindu, Buddhist, and Jain cosmology

Mount Meru (Sanskrit/Pali: मेरु)—also known as Sumeru, Sineru or Mahāmeru—is a five-peaked sacred mountain present within Hindu, Jain and Buddhist cosmologies, revered as the centre of all physical, metaphysical and spiritual universes. It is professed to be located at the junction of the four great cosmic continents—Pubbavideha Dīpa, Uttarakuru Dīpa, Amaragoyāna Dīpa and Jambu Dīpa. Mount Meru is also mentioned in scriptures of other, external religions to India, such as Taoism—which was influenced, itself, by the arrival of Buddhism in China.

Many Hindu, Jain and Buddhist temples have been built as symbolic representations of Mount Meru, such as Angkor Wat in Cambodia. The Sumeru Throne (Chinese: 须弥座, xūmízuò) style is a common feature of Chinese pagodas. The highest point (the finial bud) on the pyatthat, a Burmese-style multi-tiered roof, represents Mount Meru.

== Etymology ==
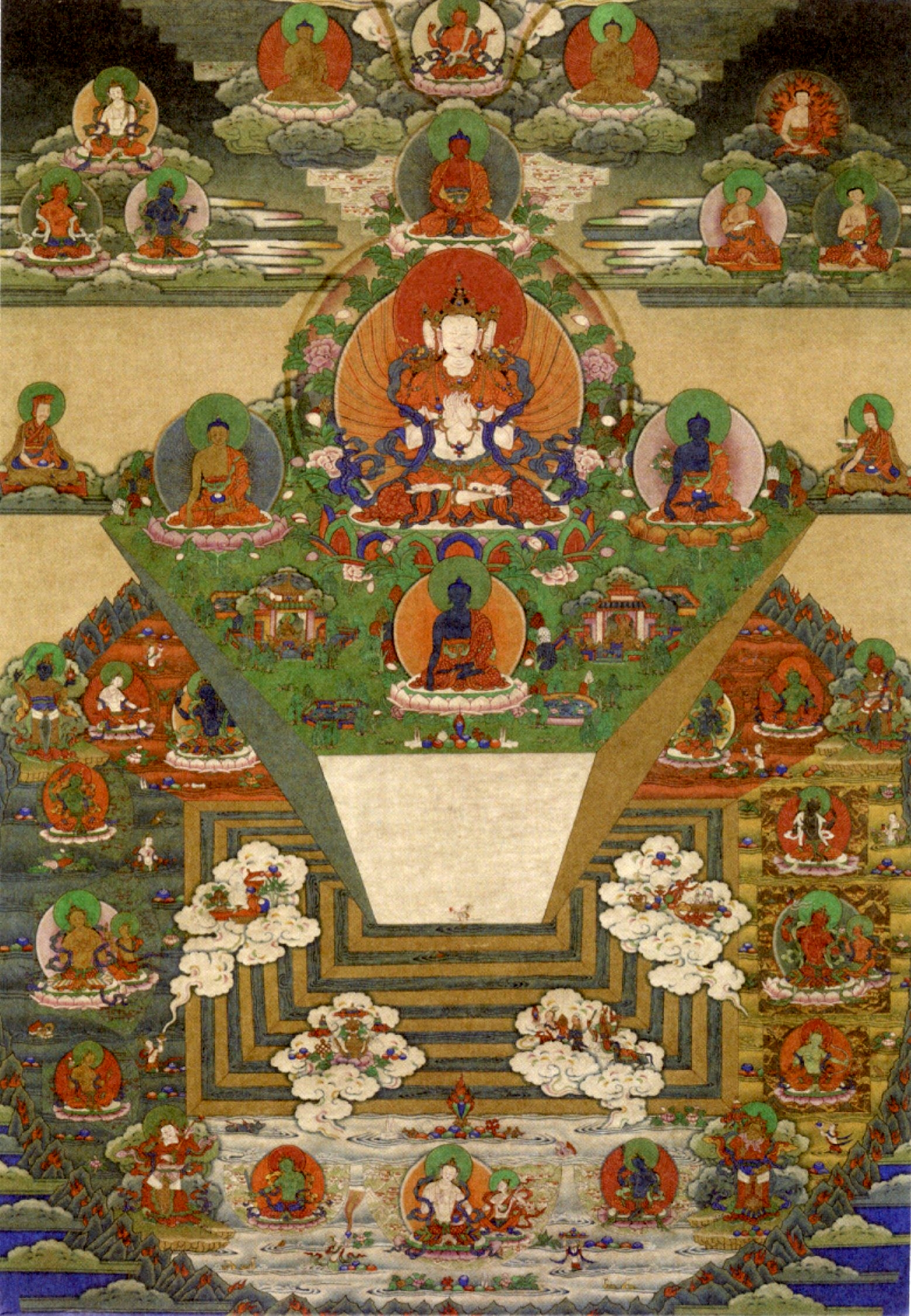
Bhutanese thangka of Mt. Meru and the Buddhist universe (19th century, Trongsa Dzong, Trongsa, Bhutan).

Etymologically, 'meru' in Sanskrit means "high." The proper name of the mountain is Meru (Sanskrit: Meruparvata), to which the approbatory prefix su- is added, resulting in the meaning "excellent Mount Meru" or "sublime Mount Meru". Meru is also the name of the central bead in a mālā.

== Geography ==
Several versions of cosmology can be found in existing Hindu texts. In all of them, cosmologically, the Meru mountain was also described as being surrounded by Mandrachala Mountain to the east, Suparshva Mountain to the west, Kumuda Mountain to the north, and Kailasha to the south. The dimensions attributed to Mount Meru—which all refer to it as a part of the Cosmic Ocean, along with several other statements that describe it in geographically vague terms (for example, "the Sun along with all the planets circle the mountain")—make the determination of its location most difficult, according to most scholars.

Several researchers identify Mount Meru or Sumeru with the Pamirs, northwest of Kashmir. Some scholars such as Michael Witzel and Georg Morgenstierne identify Mount Meru with Terich Mir, the highest peak in Hindu Kush located beyond Pamirs. Despite not having a clearly identified or known geophysical location, Mount Meru is, nevertheless, always thought of as being either in the Himalayan Mountains or the Aravalli Range (in western India).

The Suryasiddhanta mentions that Mt. Meru lies at the centre of the Earth ("bhuva-madhya") in the land of the Jambunad (Jambudvīpa).

Narapatijayacharyasvarodaya, a ninth-century text, based on mostly unpublished texts of Yāmal Tantr, states:

Sumeruḥ Prithvī-madhye shrūyate drishyate na tu

transl. Sumeru is heard to be at the centre of the Earth, but is not seen there.

== In Buddhism ==
According to Buddhist cosmology, Mount Meru is at the centre of the world, and Jambūdvīpa is south of it. It is 80,000 yojanas wide and 80,000 yojanas high according to the Abhidharmakośabhāṣyam and 84,000 yojanas high according to the Long Āgama Sutra. At the peak of Mount Meru is Trāyastriṃśa, the realm where the ruler Śakra resides. The Sun and the Moon revolve around Mount Meru, and as the Sun passes behind it, it becomes nighttime. The mountain has four faces—each one made of a different material; the northern face is made of gold, the eastern one is made of crystal, the southern one is made of lapis lazuli, and the western one is made of ruby.

In Vajrayāna, maṇḍala offerings often include Mount Meru, as they in part represent the entire universe. It is also believed that Mount Meru is the home of the Buddha Cakrasaṃvara.

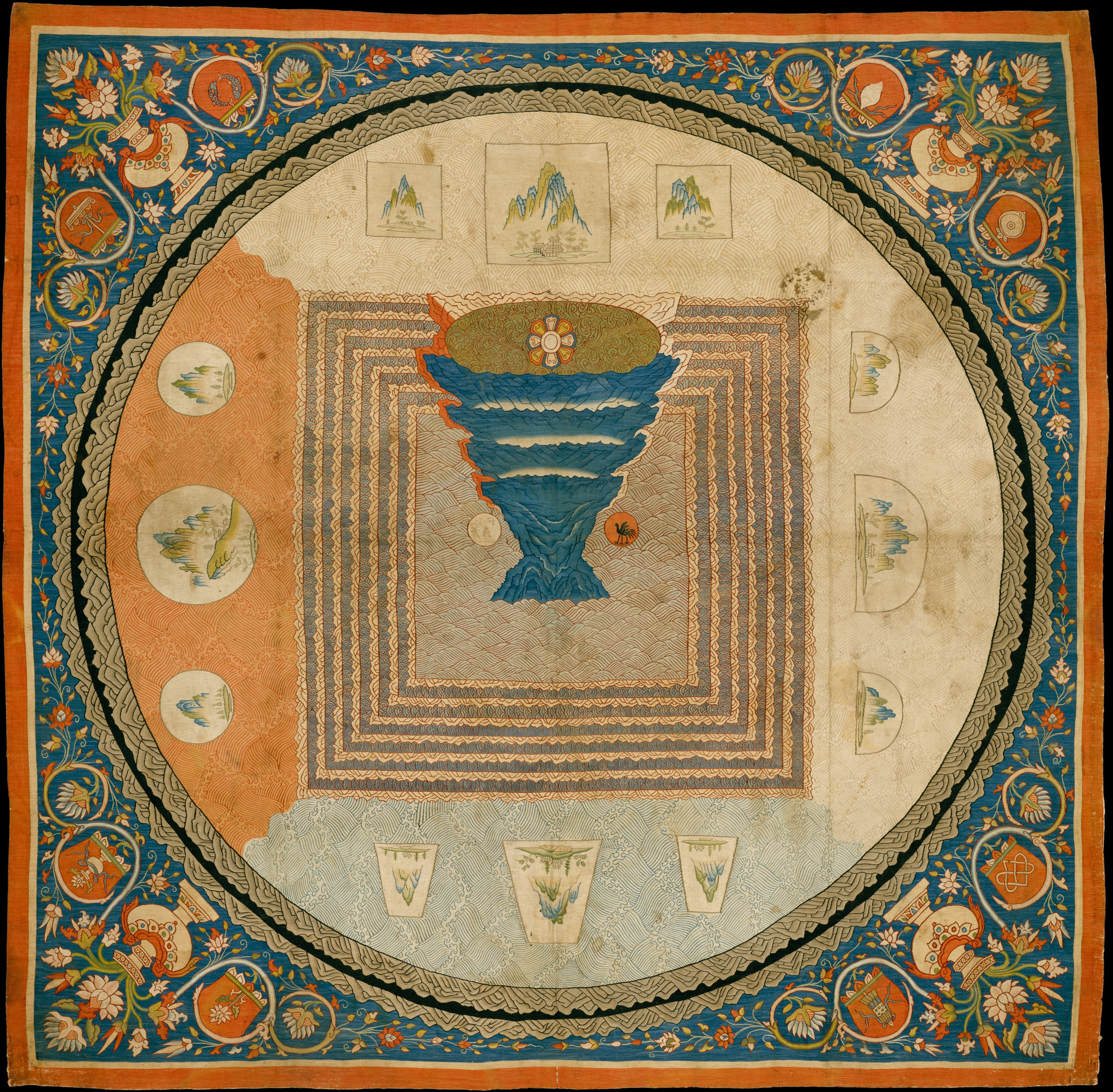
Yuan dynasty 1271–1368) Chinese mandala depicting Mount Meru as an inverted pyramid topped by a lotus.

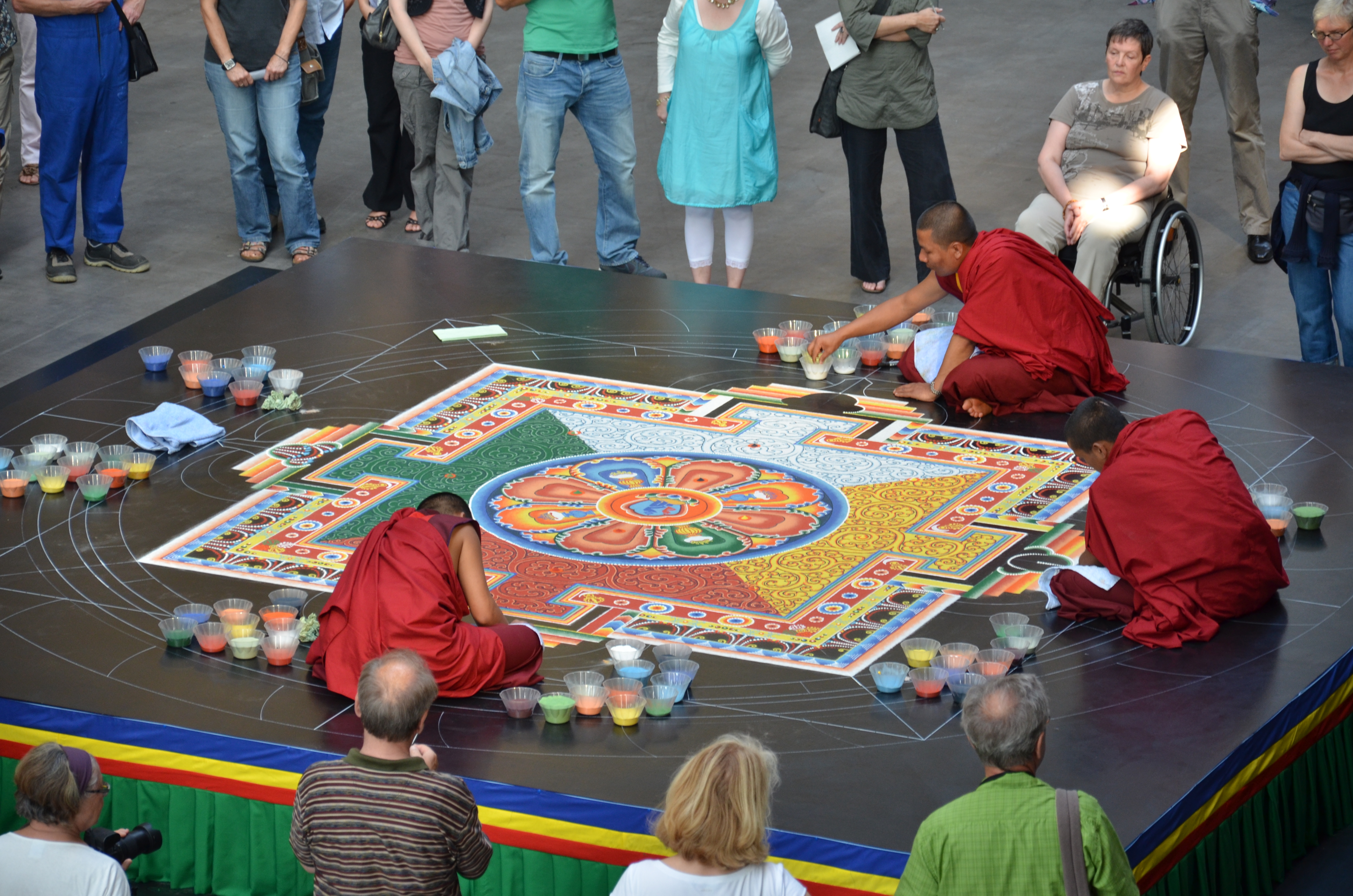
Tibetan Cakrasaṃvara sand mandala with Mount Meru in the centre.

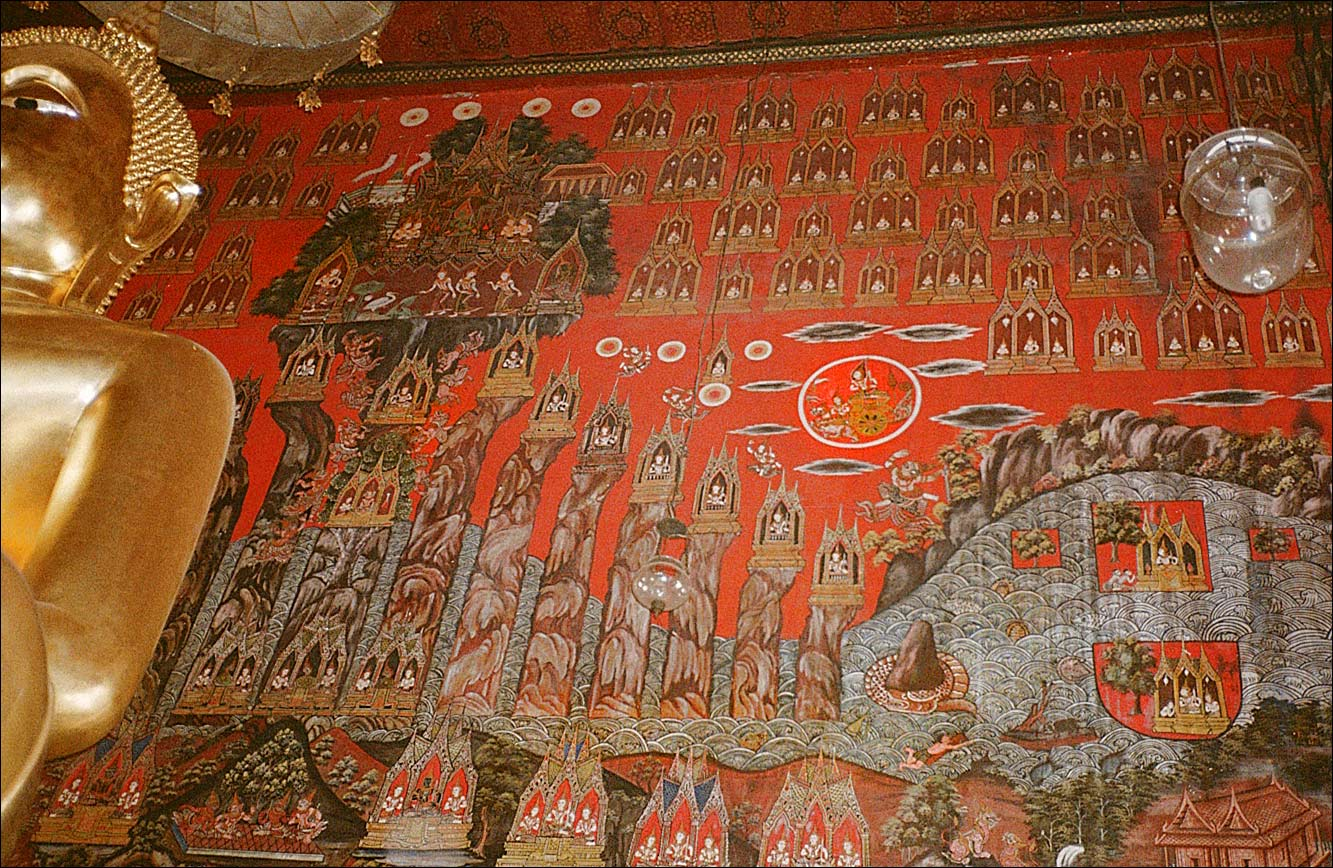
A mural depicting Mt. Meru, in Wat Sakhet, Bangkok, Thailand.

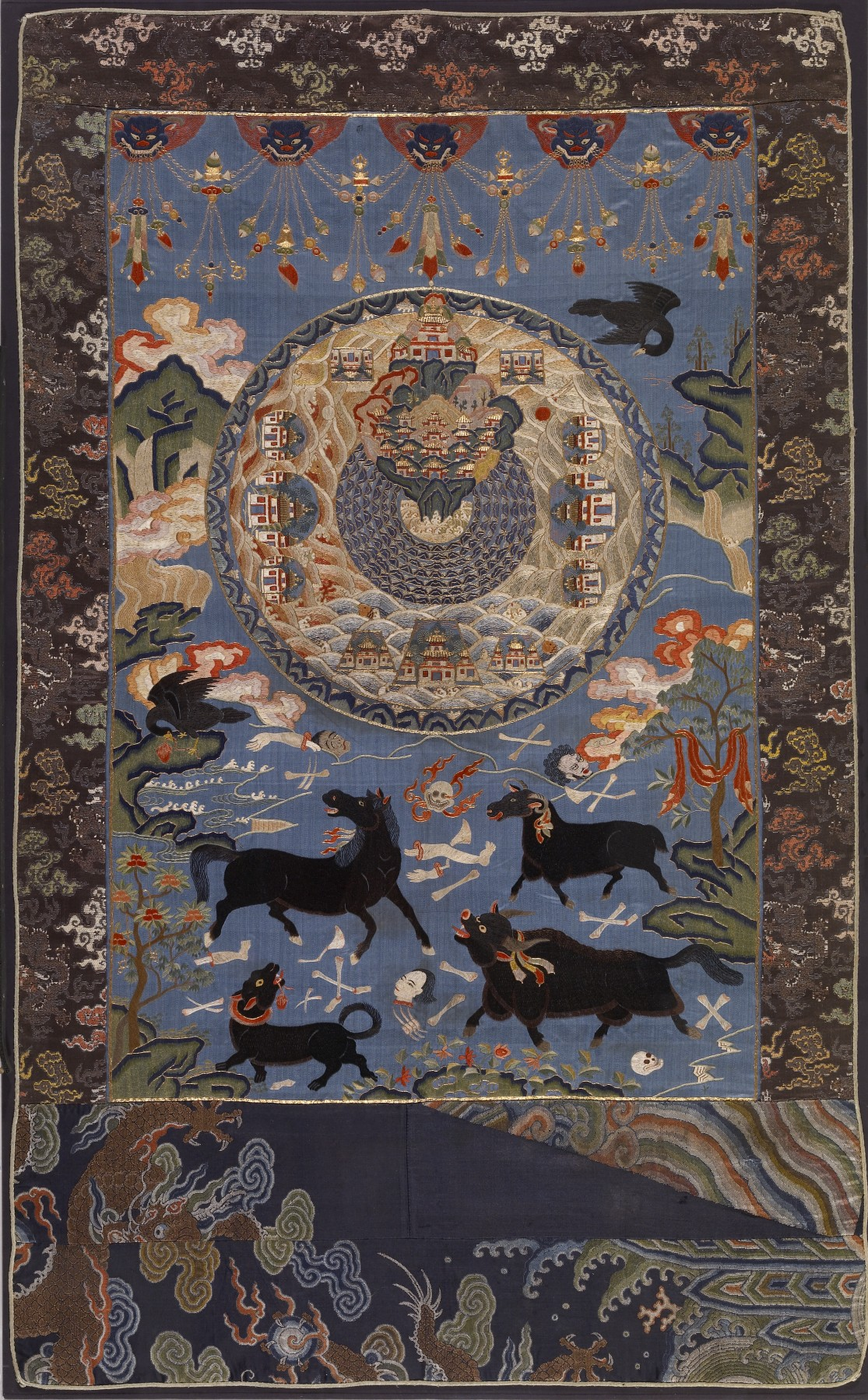
Tibetan Buddhist embroidery representing Mount Sumeru.

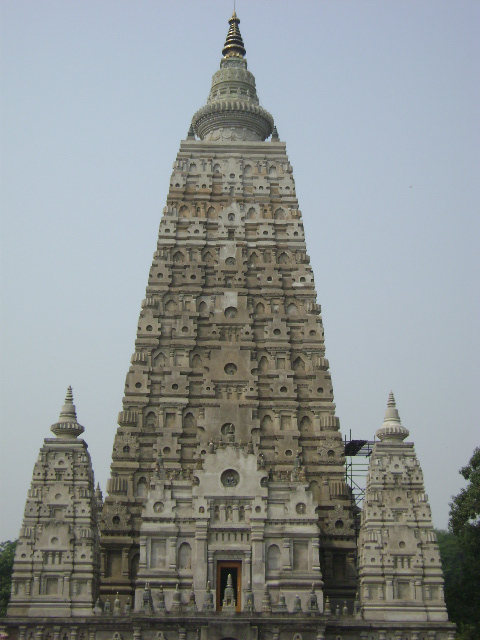
The Mahabodhi Temple, a famous Buddhist temple at Bodhgaya, India, representing Mount Meru.

== In Hinduism ==
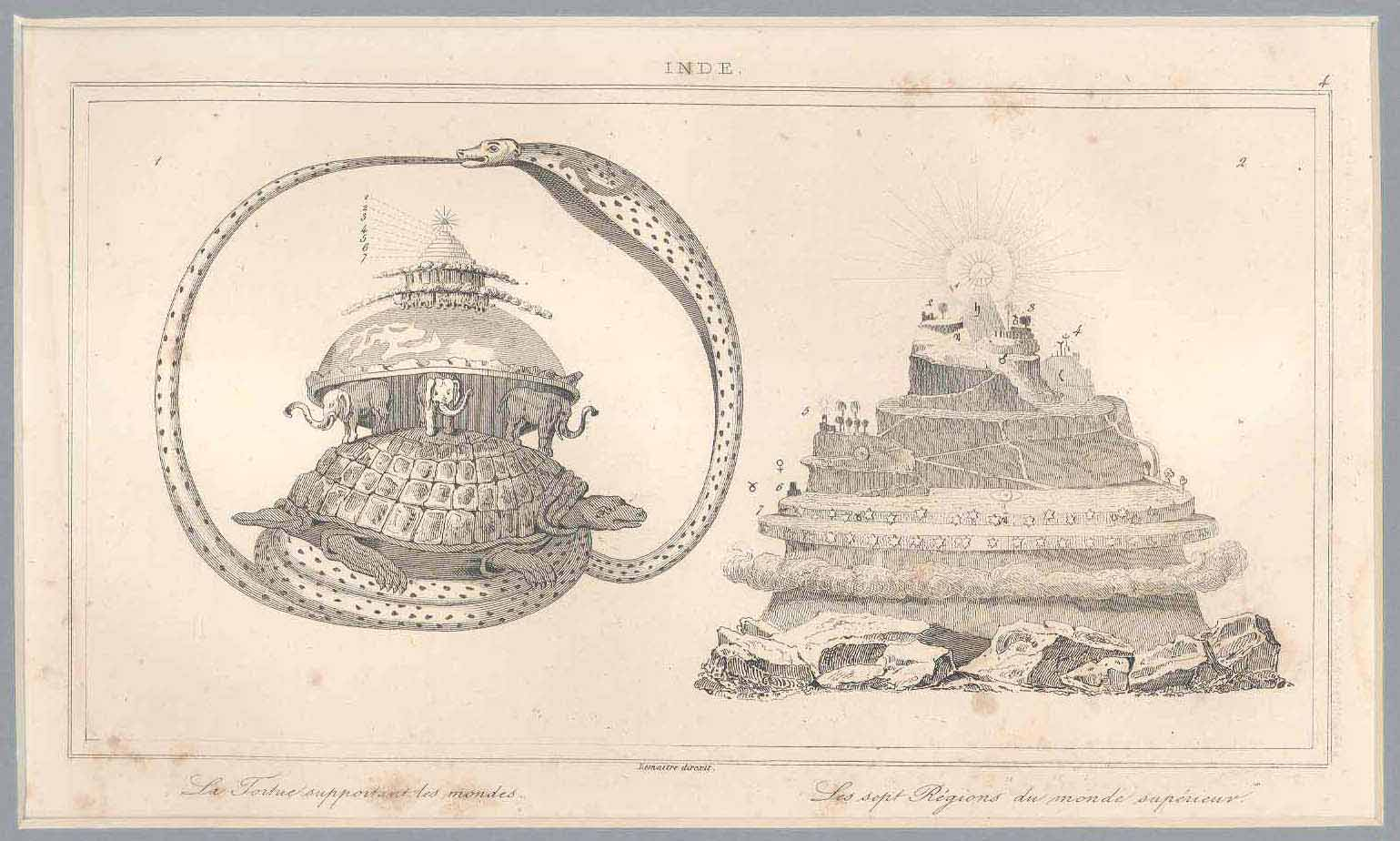
The cosmic tortoise, and Mount Meru

Hindus believe Mount Meru to be a stairway to Svarga, a heaven where the devas reside. Meru is considered as the center of the universe and is described as 84,000 yojanas high, about 1,082,000 km (672,000 mi), which would be 85 times the Earth's diameter. One yojana can be taken to mean about 11.5 km (9 miles), though its magnitude seems to differ over periods—for example, the Earth's circumference is 3,200 yojanas according to Varahamihira and slightly less so in the Aryabhatiya, but is said to be 5,026.5 yojanas in the Suryasiddhānta. The Matsya Purana and the Bhagavata Purana, along with some other Hindu texts, consistently give the height of 84,000 yojanas to Mount Meru, which translates into 672,000 miles or 1,082,000 kilometers. The Sun and Moon along with all the planets revolve around Mount Meru which connects the earth with the under world and heaven with Shiva residing on top of the mountain at Kailasha. Gods and devas are described as frequenting Mount Meru.

According to the Mahabharata, Meru is located amidst the Himavat range between Malayavat and Gandhamadhana mountains. Some scriptures indicate that Shiva resides in a horn of the mountains called as Saivatra. Mahabharata further states that the mountain gleans of gold when the rays of the sun fall on it and is said to contain lovely woods, lakes, rivers adorned with fruit trees, precious stones and life saving herbs. It also describes Meru as the means to reach heaven and only a being without any sins would be able to scale it. Meru is also said to be the residence of Kubera who lives near a golden gate with a lake called Alaka adorned with golden lotuses and sweet tasting water from which Mandakini river arises. As per the Mahabharata, the Pandavas along with their wife Draupadi, traveled towards the summit of the mountain as a means to reach the heaven but only Yudhishthira who was accompanied by a dog, was able to make it.

The Hindu epic Ramayana describes Kailash and Lake Manasarovar located in the Mount Meru as places unlike anywhere in the world. Mount Meru is also said to be kingdom of King Kesari, father of Lord Hanuman.

Vishnu Purana states that Meru is a pillar of the world, located at the heart of six mountain ranges symbolizing a lotus. It also states that the four faces of Mount Kailash are made of crystal, ruby, gold, and lapis lazuli. It further talks about Shiva sitting in a lotus position, engaged in deep meditation within the confines of the mountain. The mountain is home to four lakes, whose water is shared by the gods and four rivers that originate from the Ganges and flow to the earth. The Vayu Purana describes similarly with the mountain located close to a lake consisting of clear water with lotuses and lilies decked with water birds. Bhagavata Purana places Kailash as located south of Mount Meru. Skanda Purana mentions that the mountain is located amongst the highest peaks, perpetually covered with snow. Mount Meru was said to be the residence of King Padmaja Brahma in antiquity.

This mythical mountain of gods was mentioned in the Tantu Pagelaran, an Old Javanese manuscript written in the 15th-century Majapahit period. The manuscript describes the mythical origin of the island of Java, as well as the legendary movement of portions of Mount Meru to Java. The manuscript explains that Batara Guru (Shiva) ordered the gods Brahma and Vishnu to fill Java with human beings. However, at that time, Java island was floating freely on the ocean, always tumbling and shaking. To stop the island's movement, the gods decided to nail it to the Earth by moving the part of Mahameru in Jambudvipa (India) and attaching it to Java. The resulting mountain is Mount Semeru, the tallest mountain in Java.

== In Jainism ==
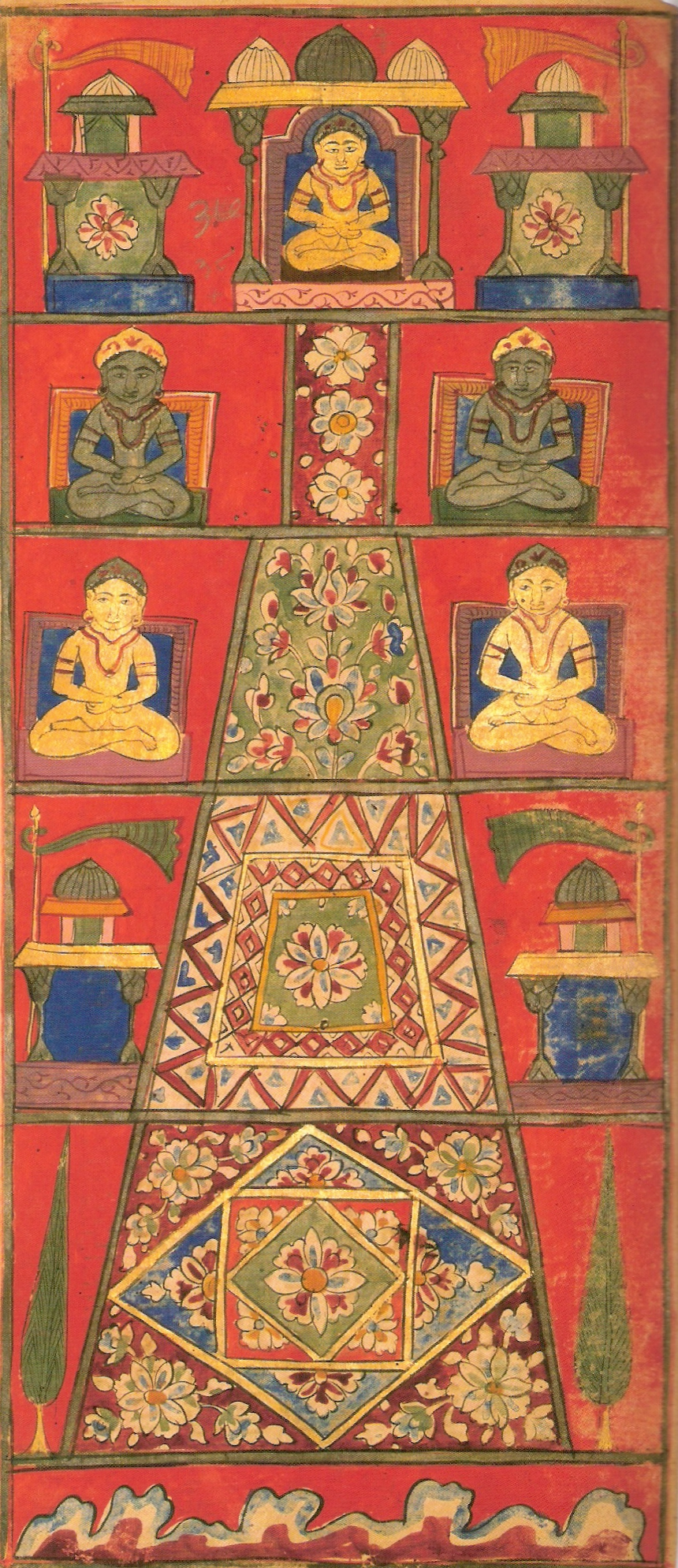
Painting of Mount Meru from Jain cosmology from the Samghayanarayana

According to Jain cosmology, Mount Meru (or Sumeru) is at the centre of the world surrounded by Jambūdvīpa, in the form of a circle forming a diameter of 100,000 yojanas. There are two sets of sun, moon, and stars revolving around Mount Meru; while one set works, the other set rests behind Mount Meru.

Every Tirthankara is taken to the summit of Meru by Indra shortly after his birth, after putting the Tirthankara child's mother into a deep slumber. There, he is bathed and anointed with precious unctions. Indra and other Devas celebrate his birth.

== Architecture ==
The concept of a holy mountain surrounded by various circles was incorporated into ancient Hindu temple architecture with a Shikhara (Śikhara) — a Sanskrit word translating literally to "peak" or "summit". This concept also continued outside India, such as in Bali, where temples feature Meru towers.

In Buddhist temples, the Mahabodhi Temple in Bodh Gaya is the earliest example of the 5th- to 6th-century depiction. Many other Buddhist temples took on this form, such as the Wat Arun in Thailand and the Hsinbyume Pagoda in Myanmar.

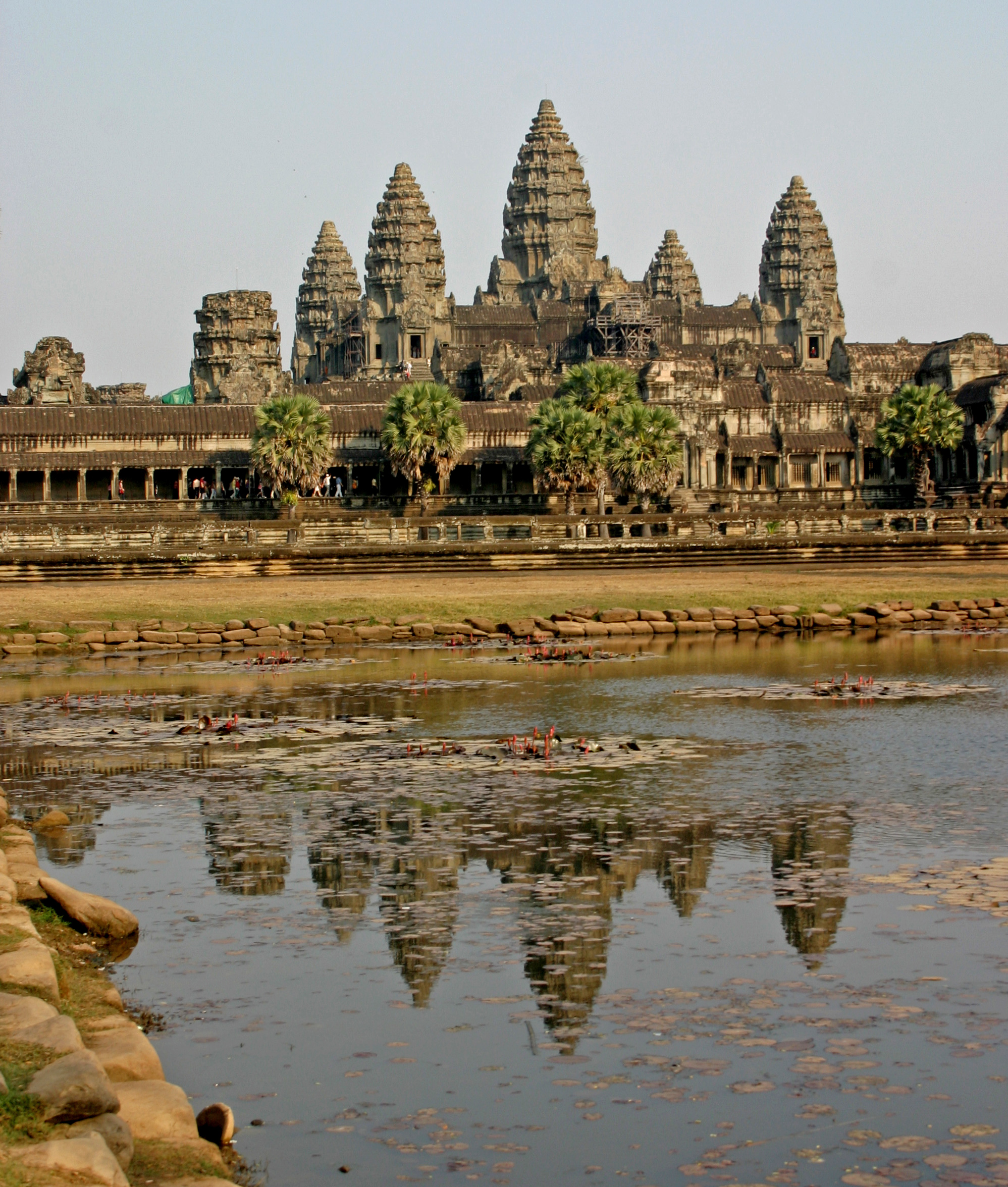
The five central towers of Angkor Wat, before a Hindu and later a Buddhist temple in Siem Reap, Cambodia, symbolize the peaks of Mount Meru

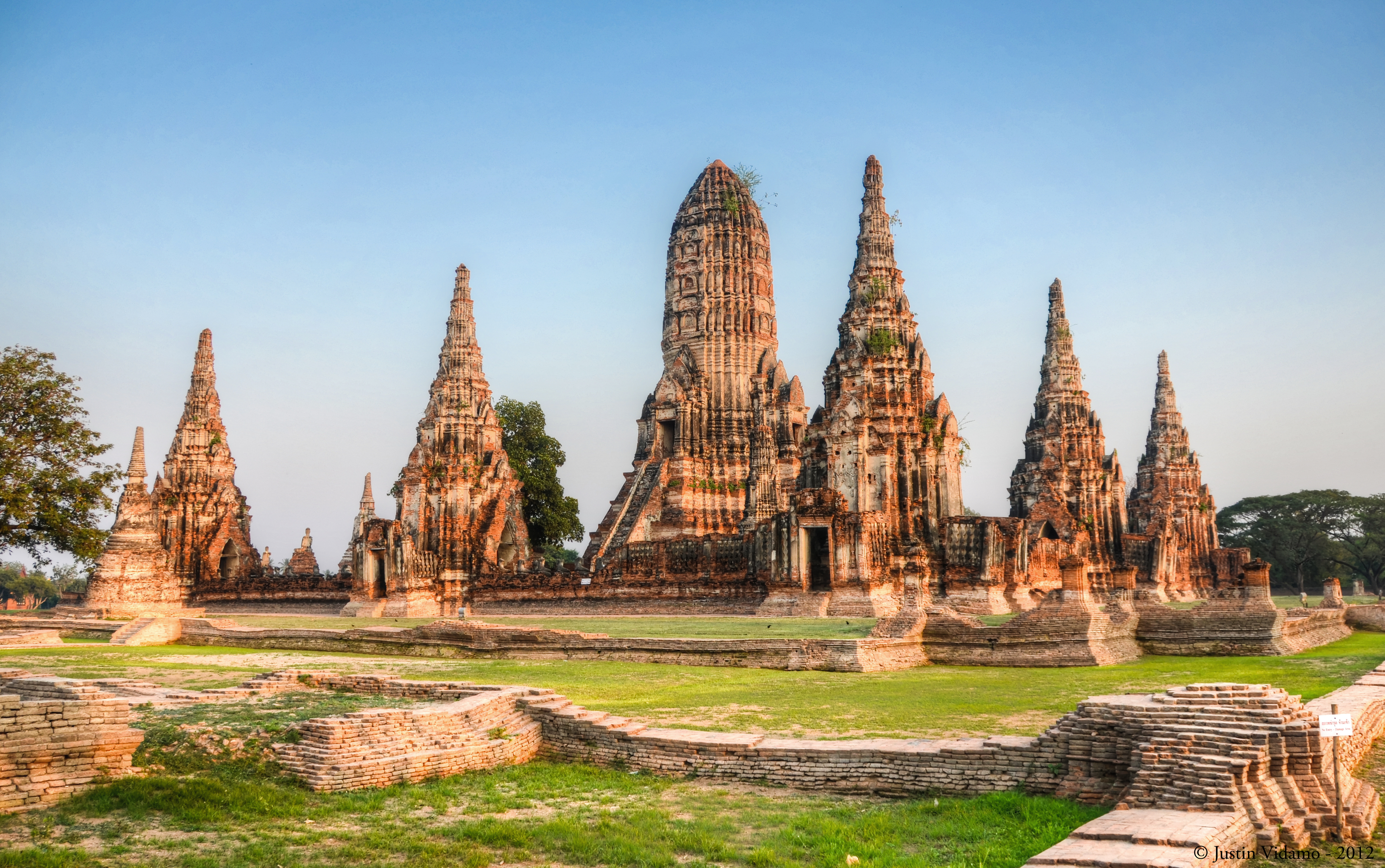
Prang of Wat Chaiwatthanaram, a Buddhist temple in Ayutthaya, Thailand, representing Mount Meru

A Buddhist prang in Wat Arun, Bangkok, representing Mount Sumeru

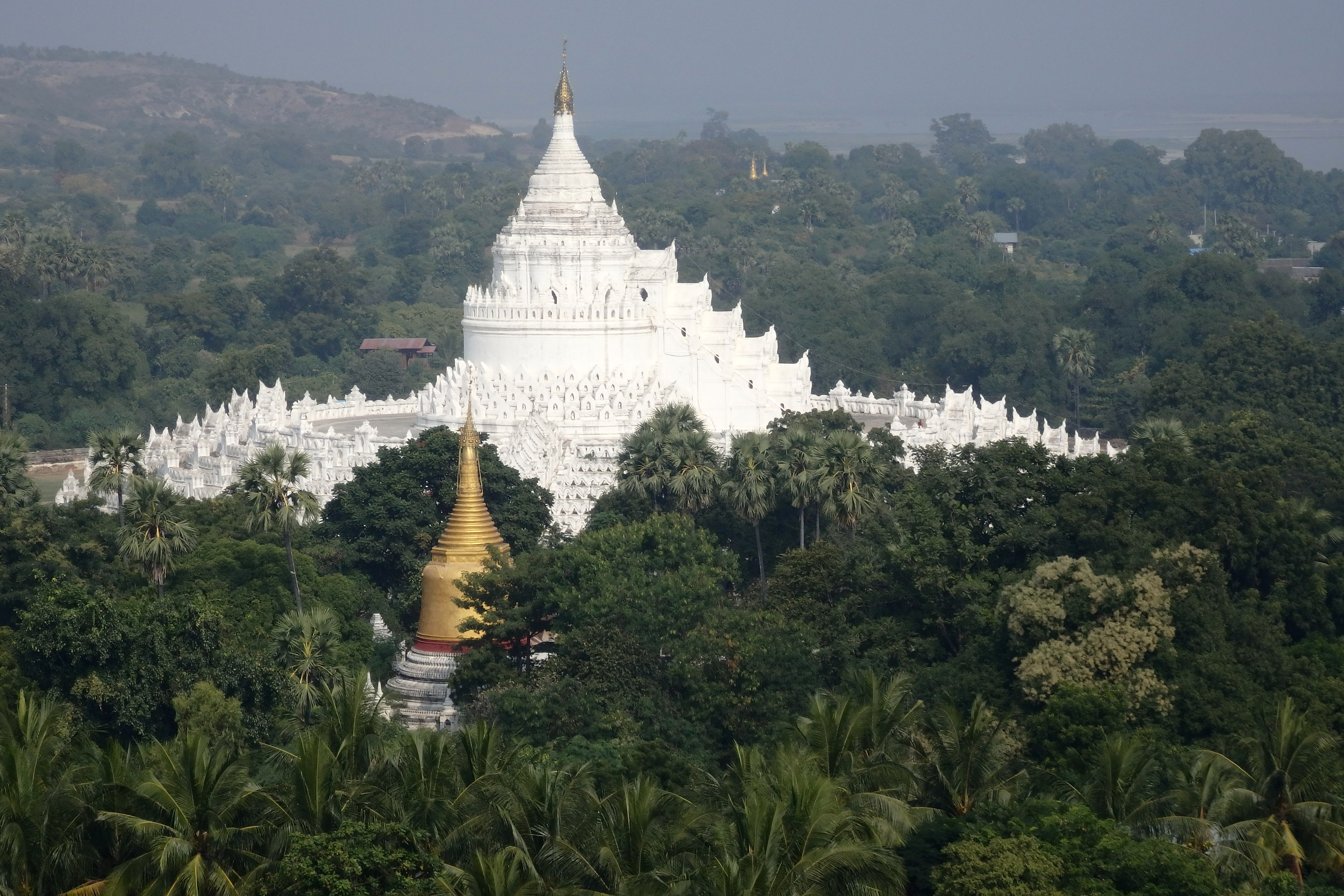
Hsinbyume Pagoda in Mandalay, Myanmar, representing Mount Sumeru

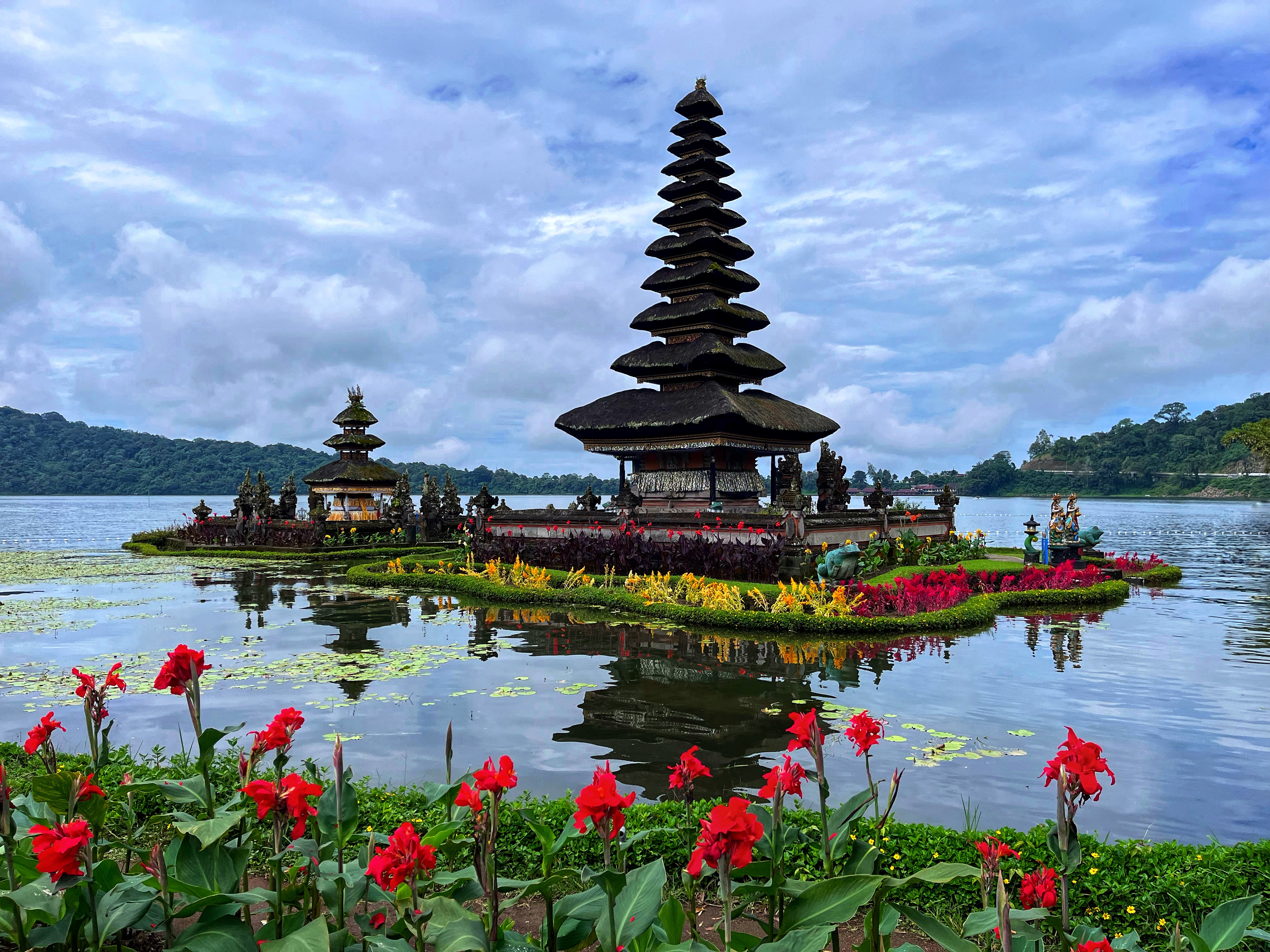
The meru of Pura Ulun Danu Bratan is dedicated to Shiva and his consort Parvathi

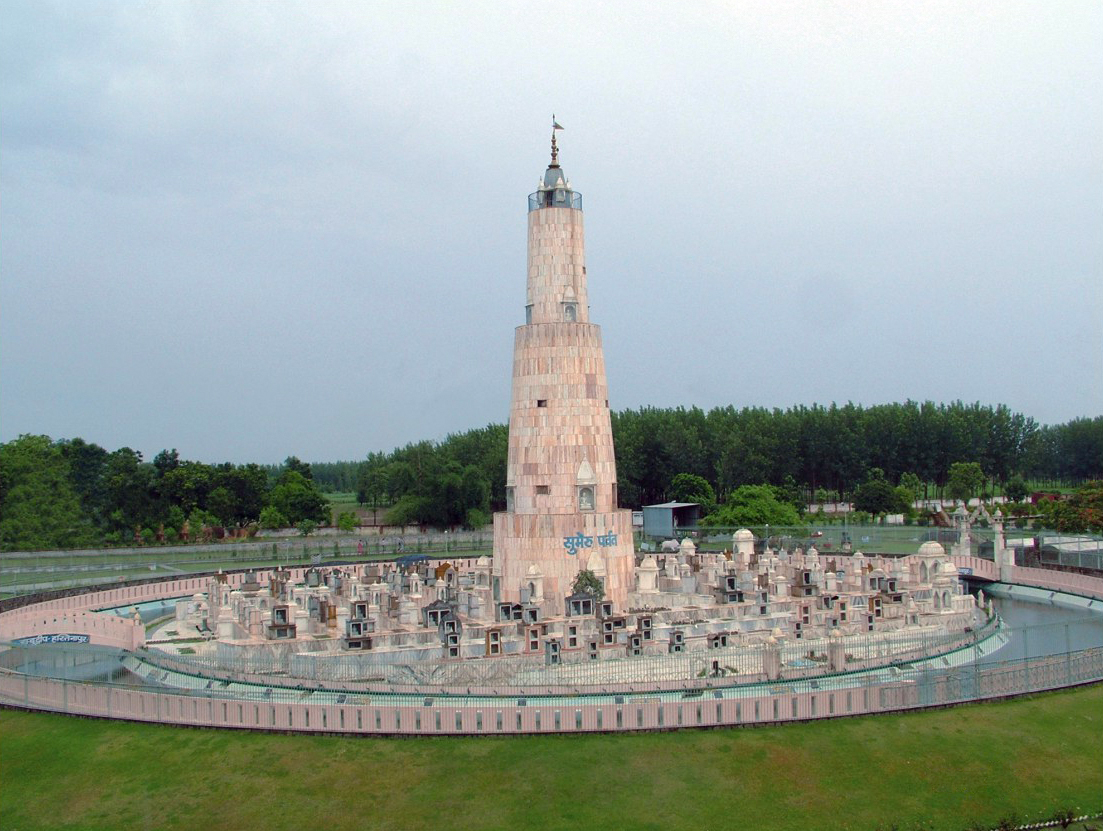
Depiction of Mount Meru at Jambudweep, a Jain temple in Uttar Pradesh

== In other languages ==
In other languages, Mount Meru is pronounced:

- Assamese: মেৰু পর্বত (Meru Pôrbôt)
- Bengali: মেরু পর্বত (Meru Porbot)
- Burmese: မြင်းမိုရ်တောင် ([mjɪ̰ɴ mò tàʊɰ̃])
- Cebuano: Bukid Meru
- Chinese: 須彌山 (Xūmíshān)
- Gujarati: મેરૂ પર્વત (Meru Parvat)
- Ilocano: Bantay Meru
- Japanese: 須弥山 (Shumisen)
- Javanese: ꦱꦼꦩꦺꦫꦸ (Semeru)
- Kannada: ಮೇರು ಪರ್ವತ (Meru Parvata)
- Khmer: ភ្នំព្រះសុមេរុ (Phnom Preah Someru) or (Phnom Preah Somae)
- Korean: 수미산 (Sumisan)
- Malayalam: മഹാമേരു പർവ്വതം (Mahameru Parvatham)
- Mongolian: Сүмбэр Уул (Sümber Uul)
- Nepali: सुमेरु पर्वत (Sumeru Parwat)
- Odia: ମେରୁ ପର୍ବତ (“Meru Pôrbôtô”)
- Old Maldivian: ސުމޭރު-މަންދަރަ "Sumēru-Mandara" (sometimes spelt as Ṣumeru-Mandara)
- Pāli: Sineru
- Punjabi: ਮੇਰੂ ਪਰਬਤ (Meru Parbat)
- Marathi, Hindi: मेरु पर्वत (Meru Parvat)
- Sanskrit: मेरु पर्वत (Meru Parvata)
- Tagalog: Bulkang Meru
- Tamil: மகா மேரு மலை (Maha Meru Malai)
- Telugu: మేరు పర్వతం (Meru Parvatham)
- Sinhala: මහා මේරු පර්වතය (Maha Meru Parvathaya)
- Tibetan: ཪི་རྒྱལ་པོ་རི་རབ་ (Wylie: ri gyal po ri rab)
- Thai: เขาพระสุเมรุ (Khao phra sumen)
- Vietnamese: Núi Tu-di

The mountain is also mentioned by Diodorus Siculus as Mēros (Μηρός) and ascribes to Dionysus events related in Indian mythology, trying to use this as explanation as to why the Greeks had come to say Dionysus was born out of a thigh (whose word in Ancient Greek is indeed μηρός).

== See also ==
- Axis mundi
- The Eight Mountains
- Hara Berezaiti
- Himavanta
- Pure Land
- Sacred mountains of India
- Yggdrasil
