= Mingun =

Mingun မင်းကွန်း ရွှာစု
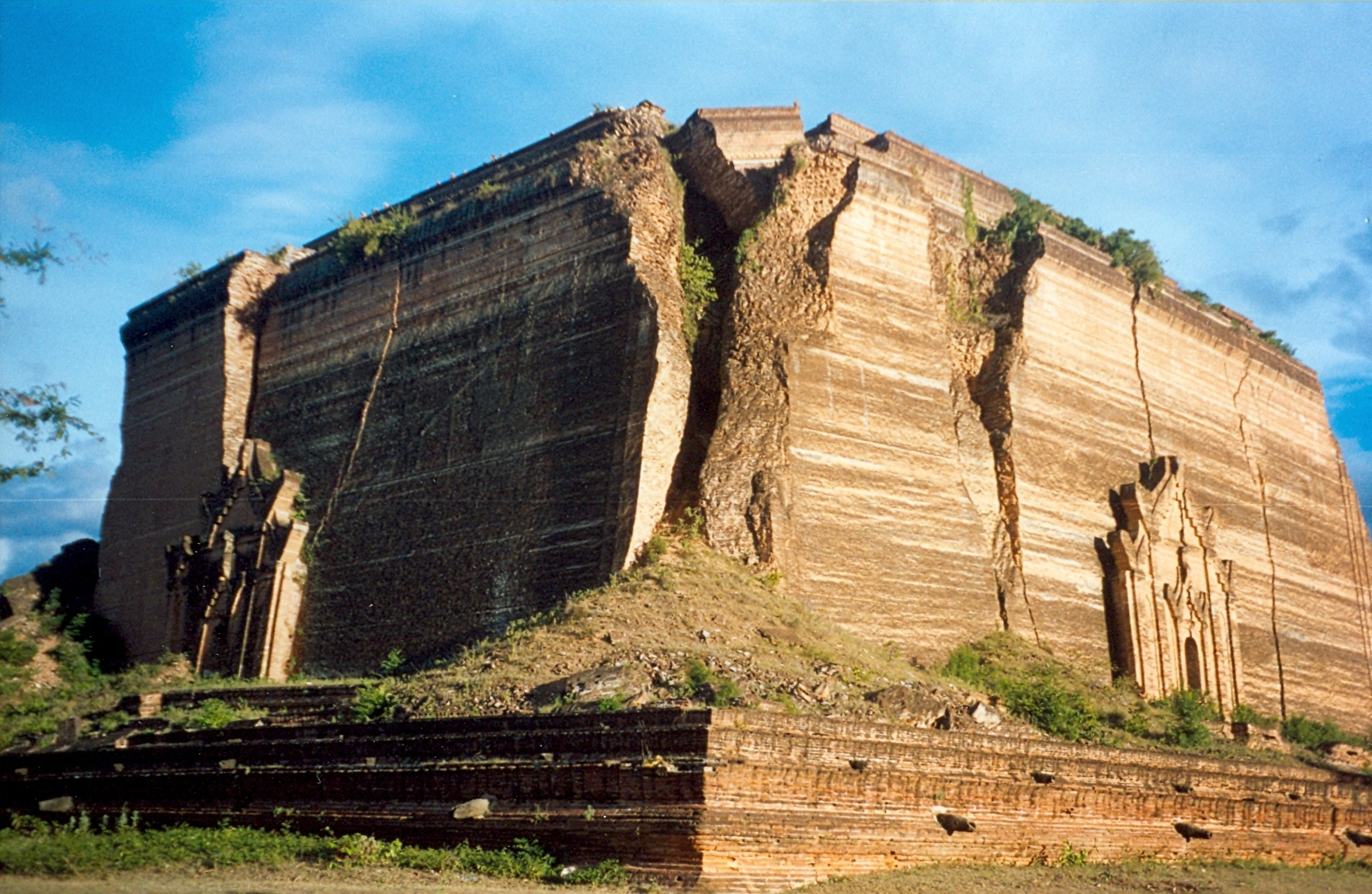

- Location in Myanmar
- Coordinates: 22°03′N 96°01′E
- Country: Myanmar
- Region: Sagaing Region
- District: Sagaing District
- Township: Sagaing Township
- Time zone: UTC+7 (MMT)

Mingun (Burmese: မင်းကွန်းမြို့, MLCTS: mang: kwan mrui. [mɪ́ɰ̃ɡʊ́ɰ̃ mjo̰]) is a village tract in Sagaing Township of Sagaing Region, north-west Myanmar, located 11 km up the Ayeyarwady River on the west bank from Mandalay. Its main attraction is the ruined Mingun Pahtodawgyi.

== Mingun Pahtodawgyi ==
The Mingun temple is a monumental uncompleted stupa begun by King Bodawpaya in 1790. It was not completed, due to an astrologer claiming that, once the temple was finished, the king would die. The completed stupa would have been the largest in the world at 150 metres (490 ft). Huge cracks are visible on the structure from the earthquake of 23 March 1839. Like many large pagodas in Myanmar, a pondaw paya or working model of the stupa can be seen nearby.

King Bodawpaya also had a gigantic bell cast to go with his huge stupa, the Mingun Bell weighing 90 tons, and is today the largest ringing bell in the world. The weight of the bell in Burmese measurement, is 55,555 viss or peiktha (1 viss = 1.63 kg), handed down as a mnemonic "Min Hpyu Hman Hman Pyaw", with the consonants representing the number 5 in Burmese astronomy and numerology.

== Hsinbyume Pagoda ==
Just a couple of hundred yards from the great stupa and bell lies the white Hsinbyume or Myatheindan Pagoda with a distinctive architectural style modelled after the mythical Mount Meru (Myinmo taung), built in 1816 by Bodawpaya's grandson and successor Bagyidaw and dedicated to the memory of his first consort Princess Hsinbyume (Lady of the White Elephant, granddaughter of Bodawpaya, 1789–1812) who died in childbirth.

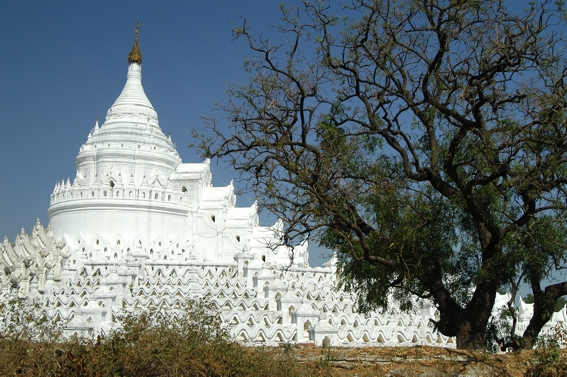
Hsinbyume or Myatheindan pagoda in Mingun

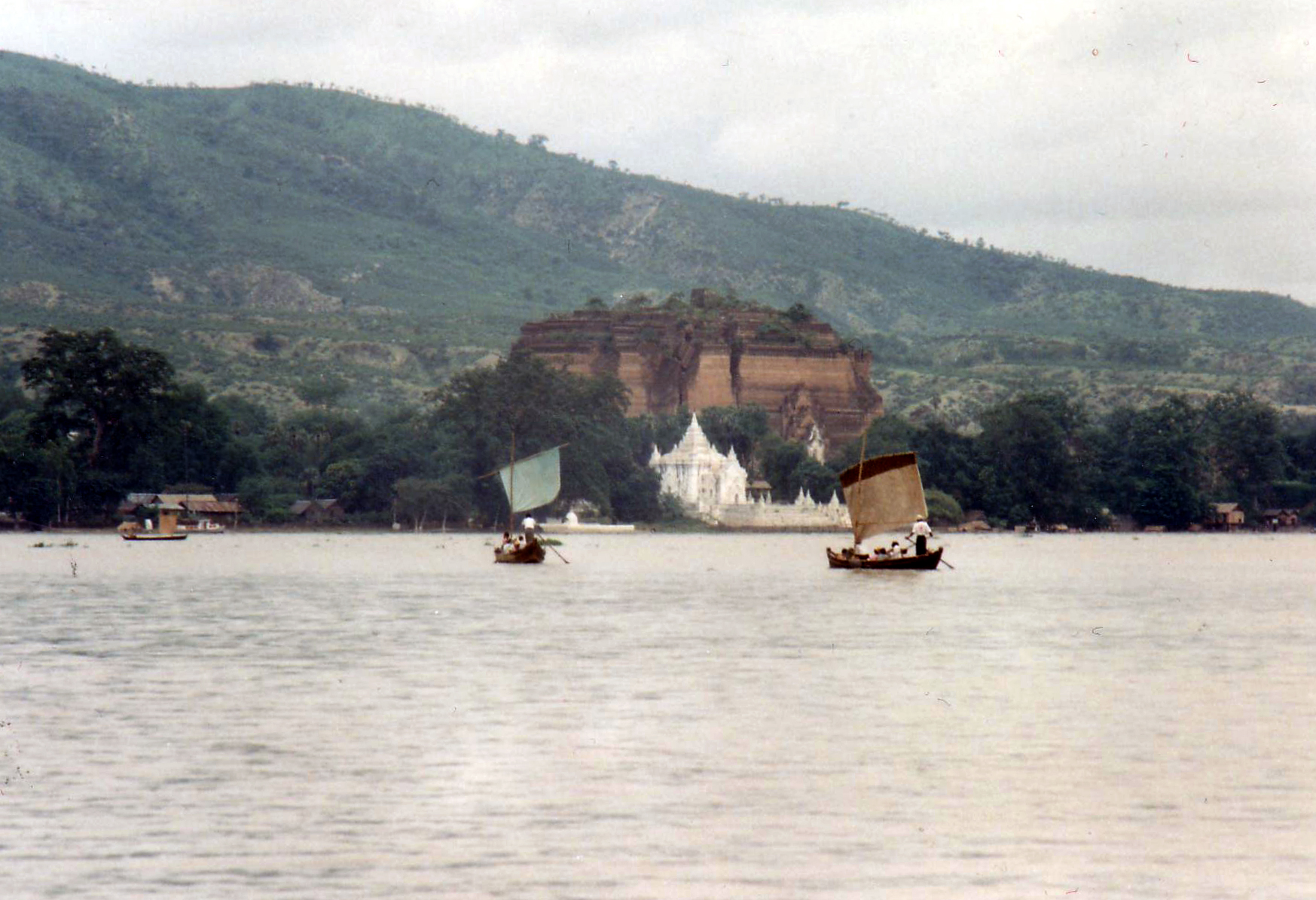
River Irrawaddy at Mingun

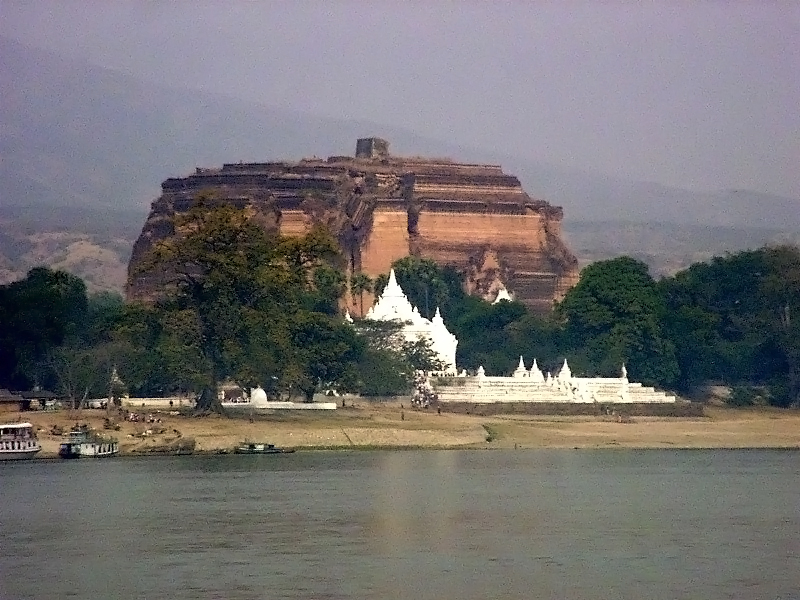
Mingun pagoda

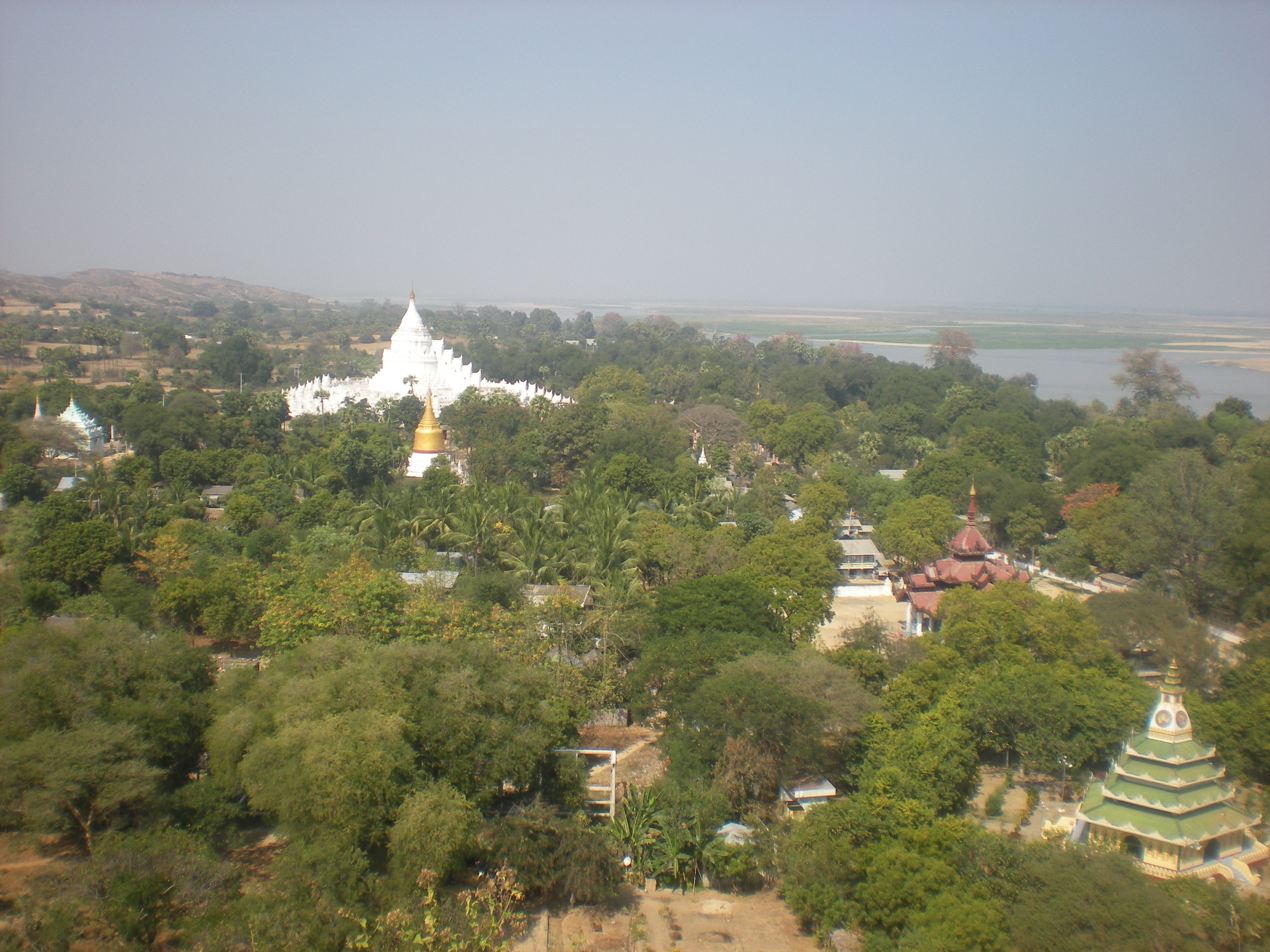
Mingun view

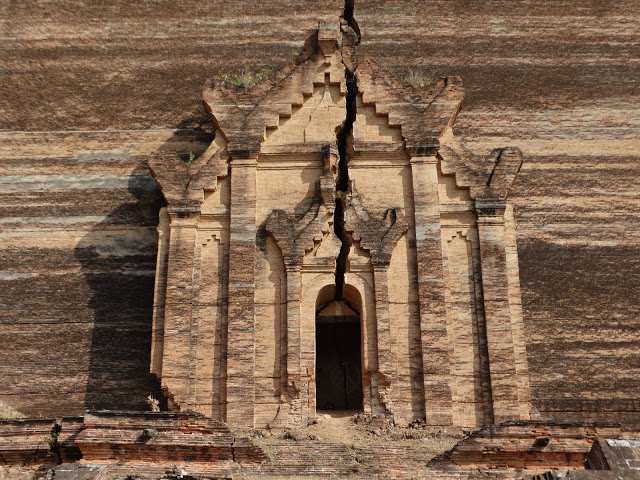
Mingun Pagoda

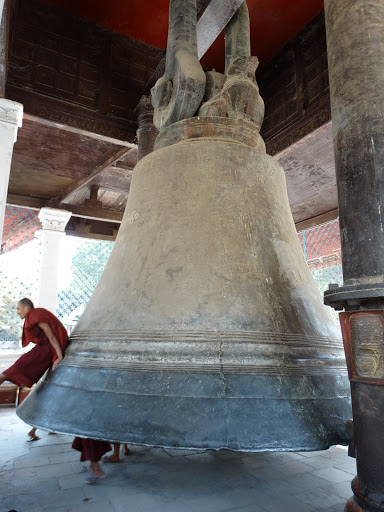
Mingun Bell

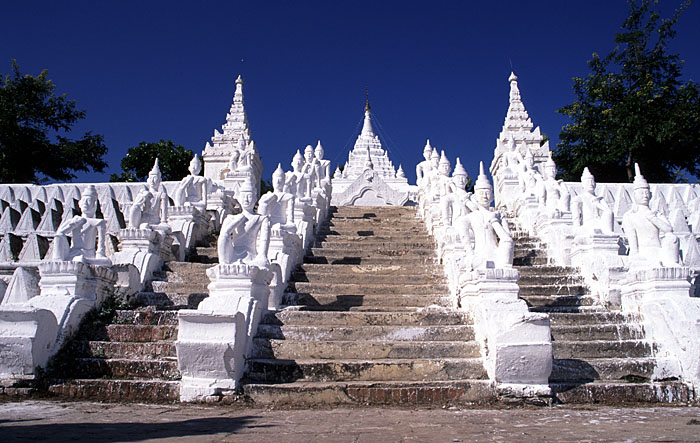
The Settawya Pagoda in Mingun.

== See also ==
- Bodawpaya
- Mingun Bell
