= Mingun Pahtodawgyi =

Buddhist temple in Myanmar

- မင်းကွန်းပုထိုးတော်ကြီး
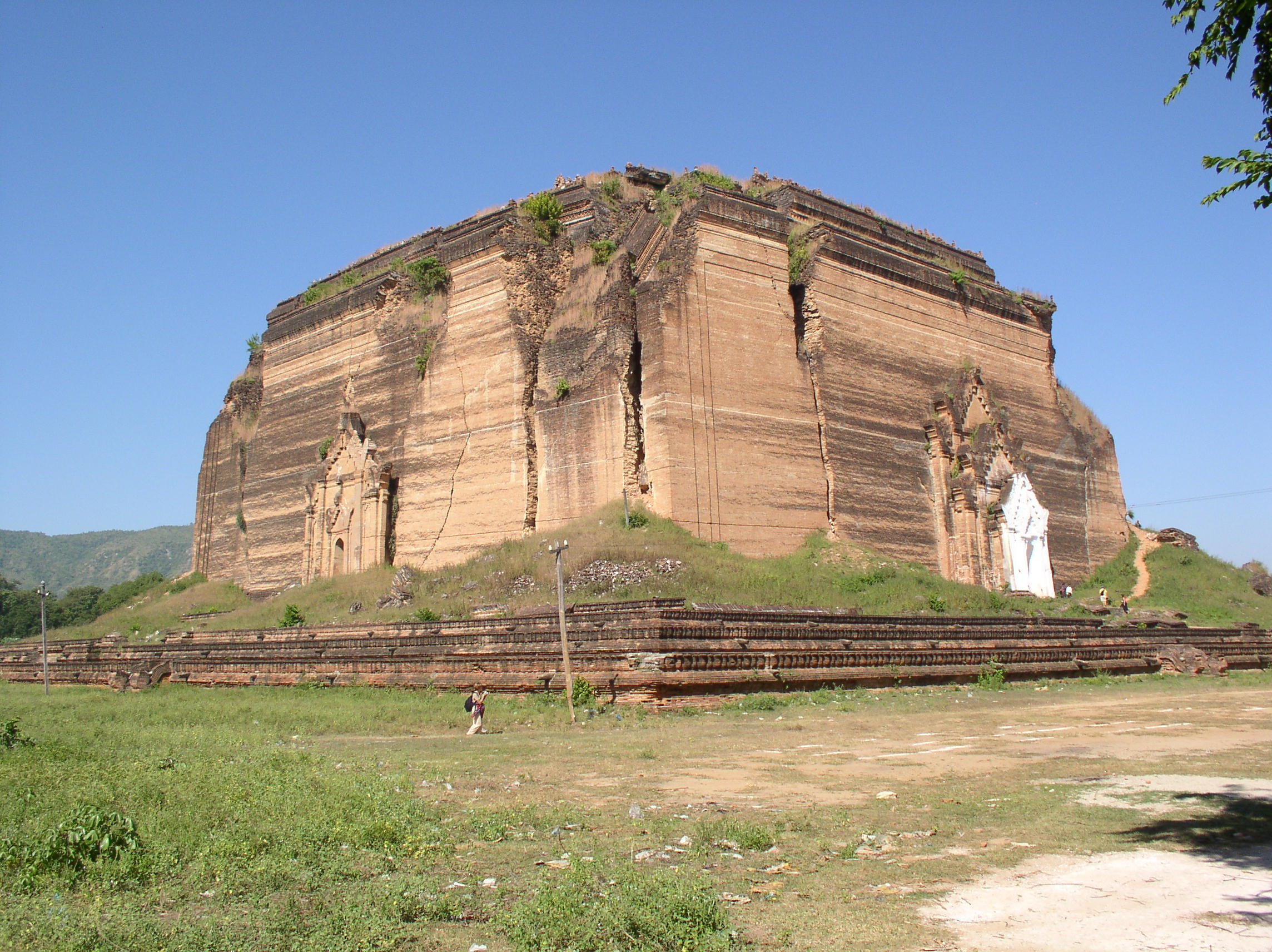
- Mingun Pahtodawgyi from the southeast

- Location within Myanmar

Religion
- Affiliation: Theravada Buddhism

Location
- Location: Mingun, Sagaing Region
- Country: Myanmar
- Coordinates: 22°03′03″N 96°01′3″E

Architecture
- Founder: King Bodawpaya
- Completed: 1790; 236 years ago

The Mingun Pahtodawgyi (မင်းကွန်းပုထိုးတော်ကြီး, IPA: [mɪ́ɰ̃ɡʊ́ɰ̃ patʰóu dɔ̀ dʑí]) is an incomplete monument stupa in Mingun, approximately 10 kilometres (6.2 mi) northwest of Mandalay in Sagaing Region in central Myanmar (formerly Burma). The ruins are the remains of a massive construction project begun by King Bodawpaya in 1790 which was intentionally left unfinished. The Pahtodawgyi is seen as the physical manifestation of Bodawpaya's well-known eccentricities. He set up an observation post on an island off Mingun to personally supervise the construction of the temple.

== Incompletion ==
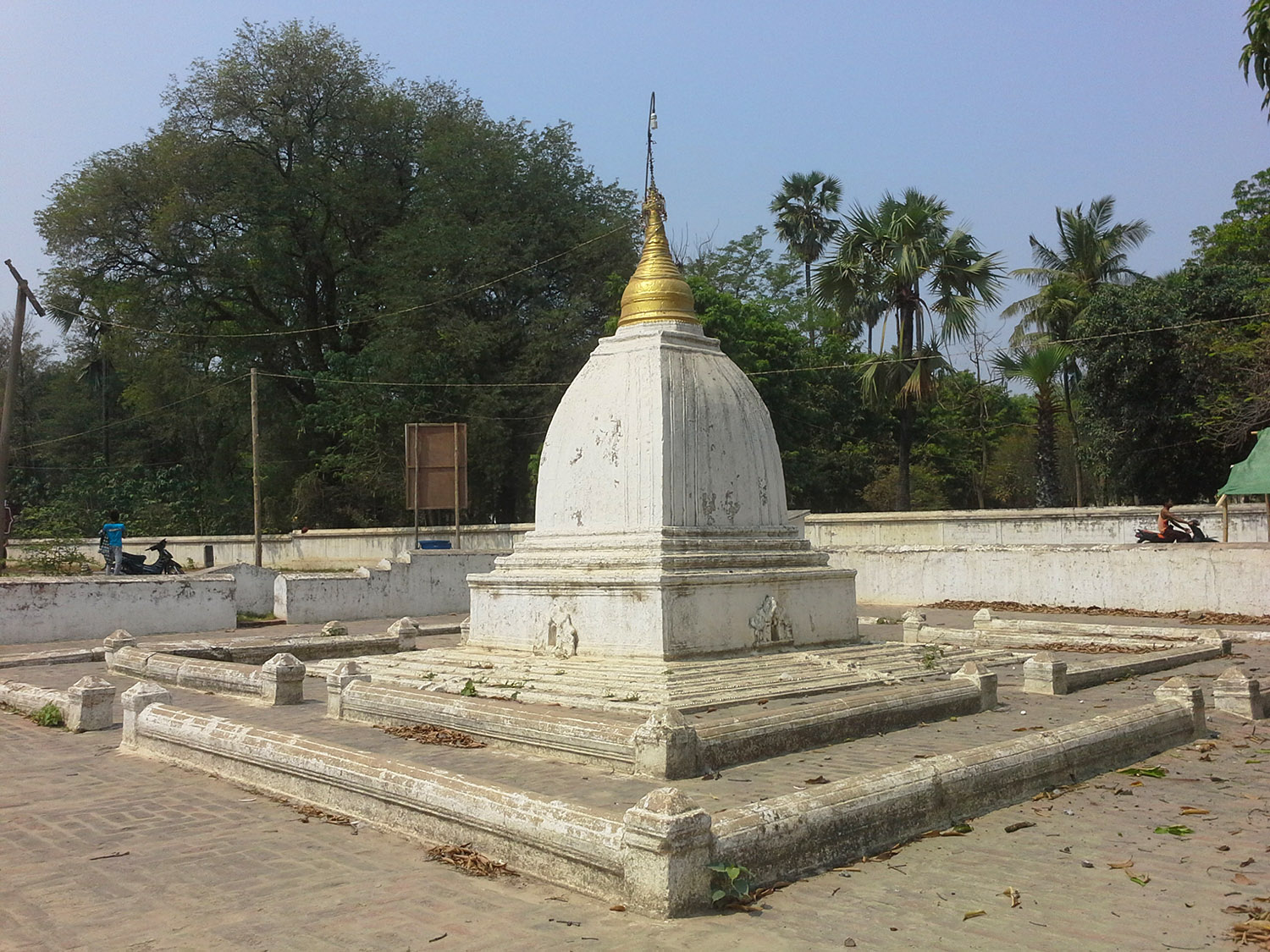
Pon Daw Pagoda (ပုံတော်စေတီ) situated near Mingun Pagoda is the 15 feet completed model of Mingun Pagoda.

Bodaw Maung Wine used thousands of prisoners of war from Arakan, deporting 20,000 people to Central Burma as slaves to work on the construction of the stupa. The construction was seen as taking a heavy toll both on the population and state, allegedly leading to the creation of a prophecy intended to halt the project, utilizing the King's deep superstition. According to the prophecy, "as soon as the building of the pagoda was over, the country would also be gone".

A variation of the story claims that the king would die once the project was completed. Thus, construction was slowed to prevent the prophecy's realisation, and when the king eventually died, the project was completely halted.

A nearby pagoda model known as the Pon Daw Pagoda, typical of many large pagoda projects like the Shwedagon Pagoda and Thatbyinnyu Temple, offers a small-scale representation of what would have been a 150 metres (490 ft) tall temple.

Despite never being completed, the site holds the record for being the largest pile of bricks in the world.

== Current condition ==
By the time the construction project was abandoned, the pagoda had reached a height of 50 metres, one third of its intended height. An earthquake on 23 March 1839 caused large cracks to appear on the face of the remaining structure. Today, the temple serves more as an attraction than a religious site. However, a small shrine with a Buddha image still serves its purpose as a place of worship and meditation. Pondaw paya or a working model of the stupa can be seen nearby.

== Mingun Bell ==
King Bodawpaya also had a gigantic bell cast to go with his huge stupa. The Mingun Bell, weighing at 90 tons, is today the second largest ringing bell in the world. The weight of the bell in Burmese measurement, is 55,555 viss or peiktha (1 viss = 1.63 kg), handed down as a mnemonic "Min Hpyu Hman Hman Pyaw", with the consonants representing the number 5 in Burmese astronomy and numerology.

== Accessibility ==
Mingun can be reached by a ferry across the Irrawaddy River from Mandalay and then optionally by foot or by bullock cart from the river jetty.

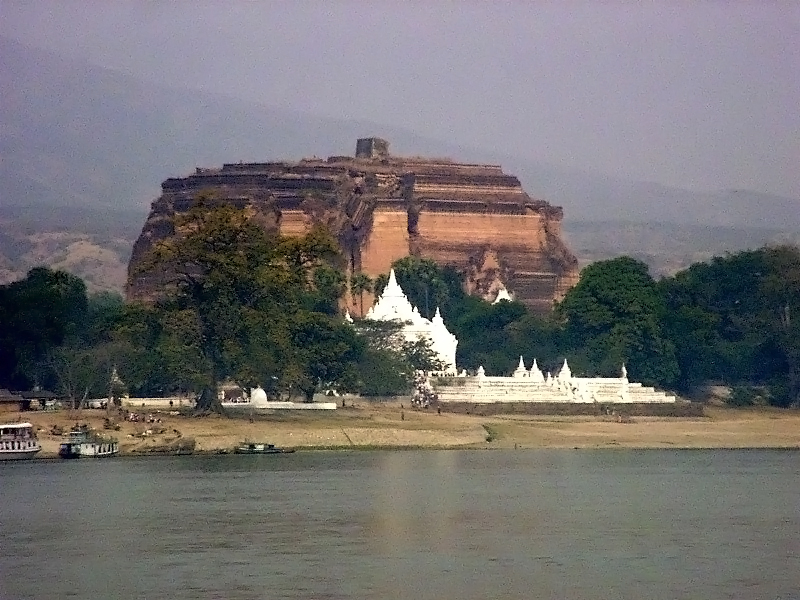
Looking westward from the Irrawaddy River

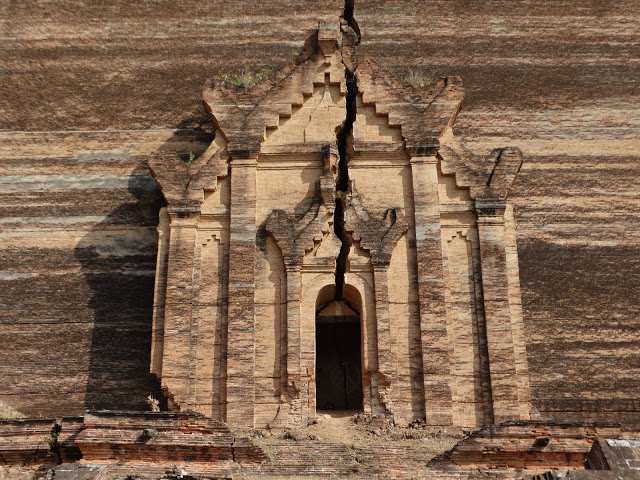
Mingun pagoda

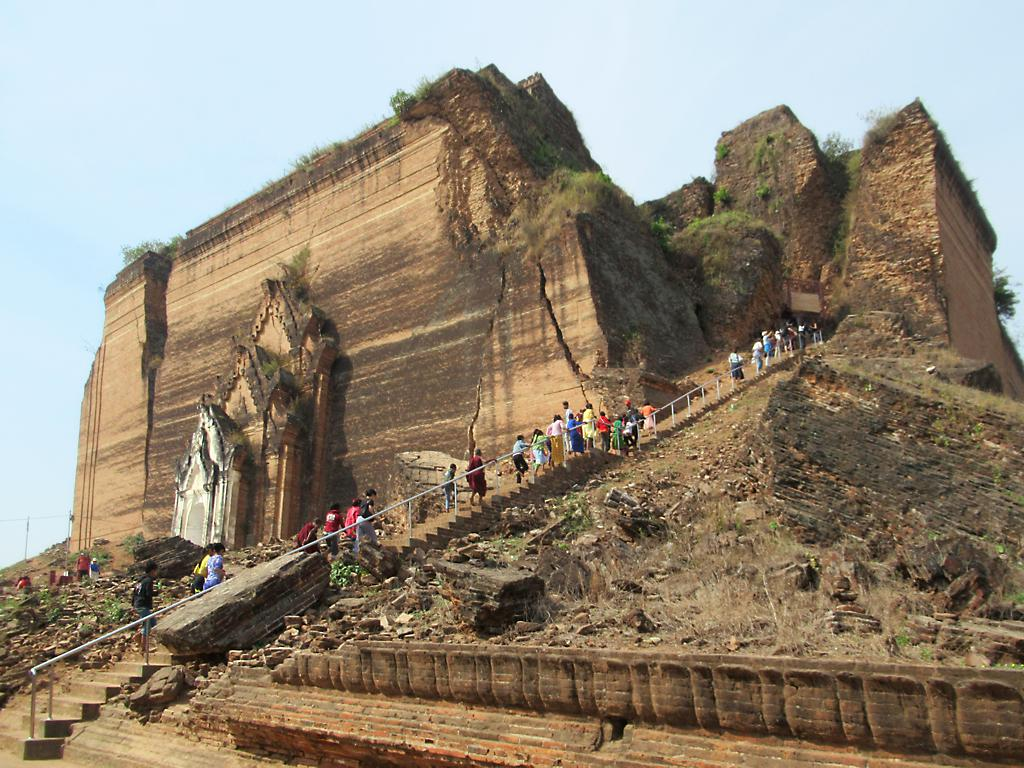
Path to the top of the pagoda

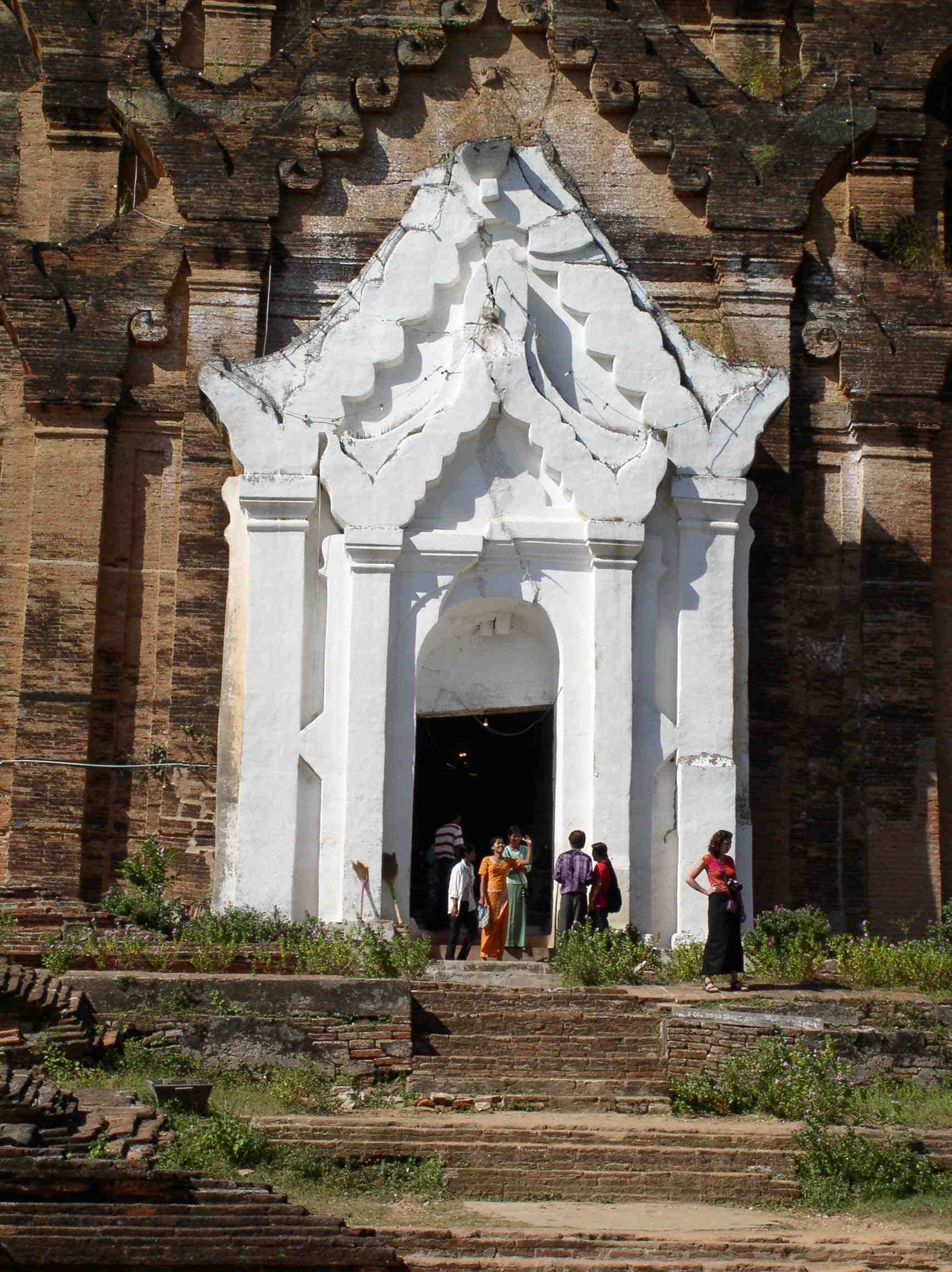
Small shrine with a Buddha inside the east portal

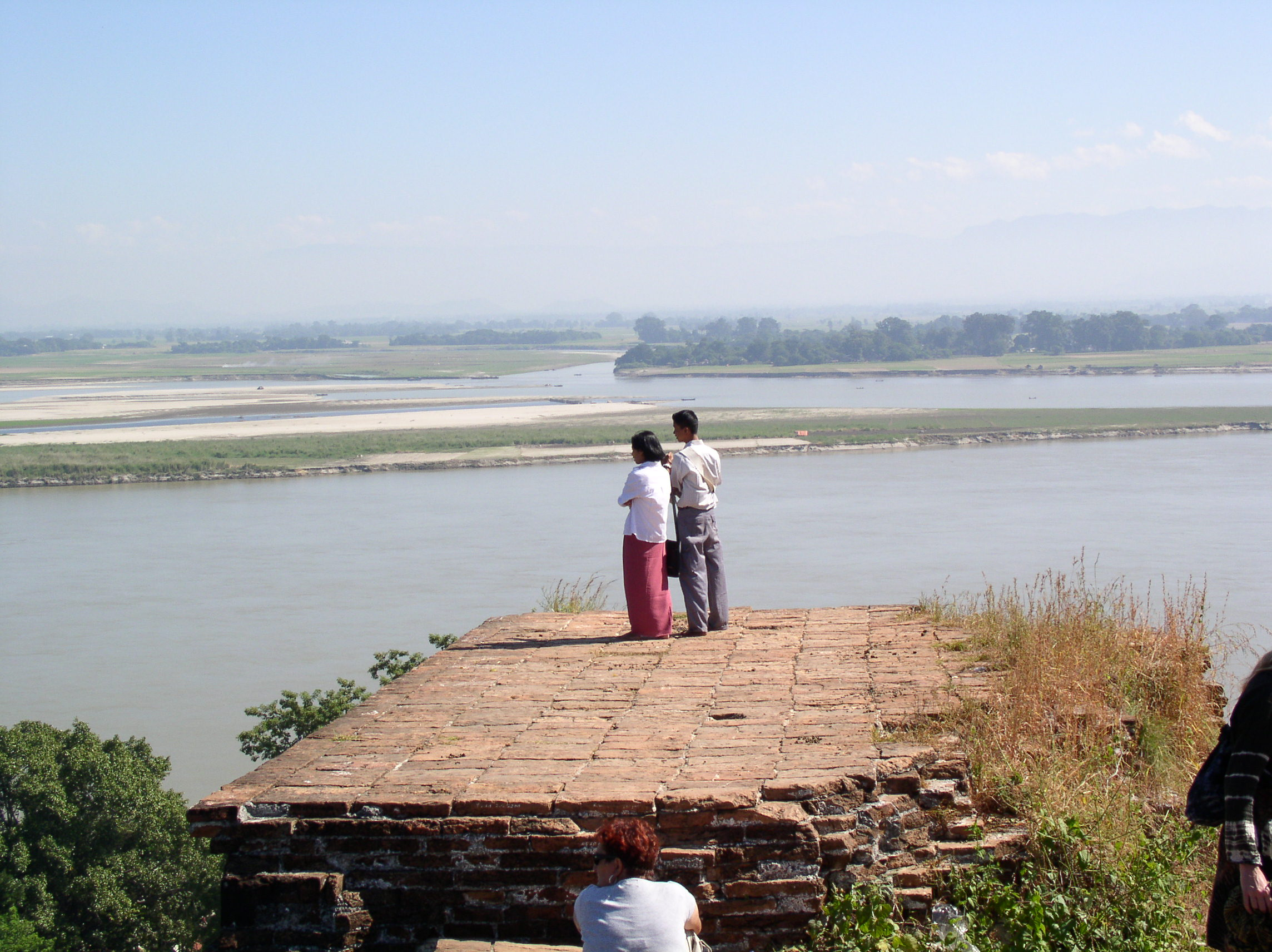
On the top of Mingun Pahtodawgyi, a small platform for a great view of the Irrawaddy River

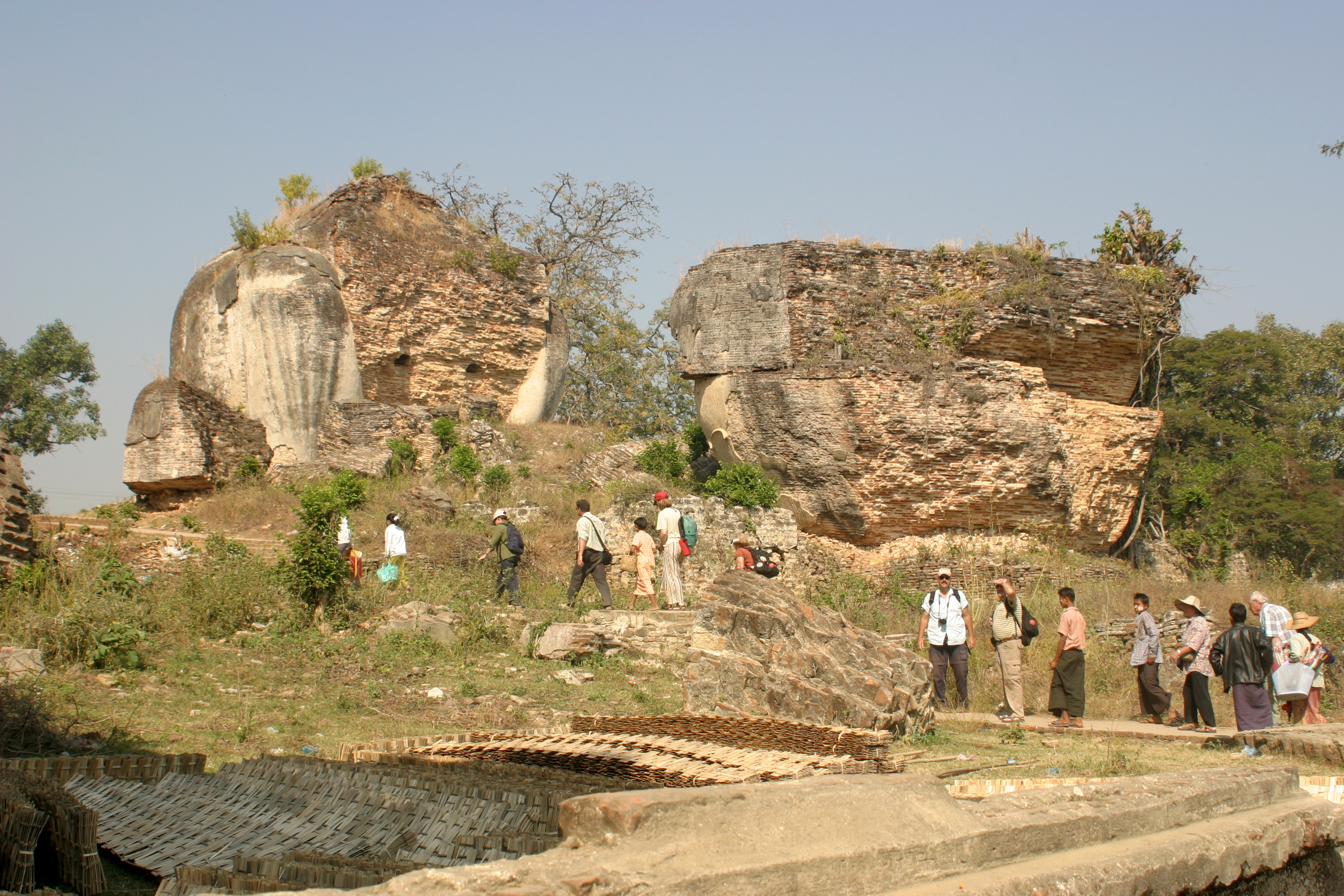
Remains of giant Chinthe

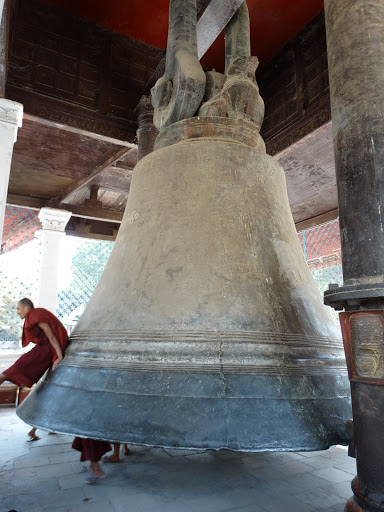
Mingun Bell

== See also ==
- Hsinphyumae Pagoda
- Bodawpaya
