= Southern Esoteric Buddhism =

Esoteric practices, views and texts within Theravada Buddhism

Southern Esoteric Buddhism and Borān kammaṭṭhāna ('former practices') are terms used to refer to certain esoteric practices, views and texts within Theravada Buddhism. It is sometimes referred to as Esoteric Theravada or Tantric Theravada due to its parallel with tantric traditions (although it makes no reference to tantras); or as Traditional Theravada Meditation.

L.S. Cousins defines it as "a type of Southern Buddhism which links magical and, ritual practices to a theoretical systematisation of the Buddhist path itself". One specific kind of Southern Esoteric Buddhism is termed the Yogāvacara tradition. It is most widely practiced today in Cambodia and Laos and in the pre-modern era was a major Buddhist current in Southeast Asia.

In the 19th century, Southern Esoteric Buddhism has declined and become stigmatized in formal contexts due to several reform movements, such as the establishment of Dhammayuttika Nikaya by Rama IV that emphasized the use of the Pali Canon as the main authority for monastic practices and also attempted to remove all superstitious and folk religious elements; the textual tradition of the Sri Lankan Mahavihara school (a part of the 12th century reforms) which took the works of the 5th century scholar Buddhaghosa as representing the orthodox interpretation; and the rule of the French colonial empire in Cambodia that suppressed pre-reform Cambodian Buddhism.

In the west, the study of Southern Esoteric Buddhism was pioneered by professor François Bizot and his colleagues at the École française d'Extrême-Orient with a particular focus on the material found at Angkor.

== History ==
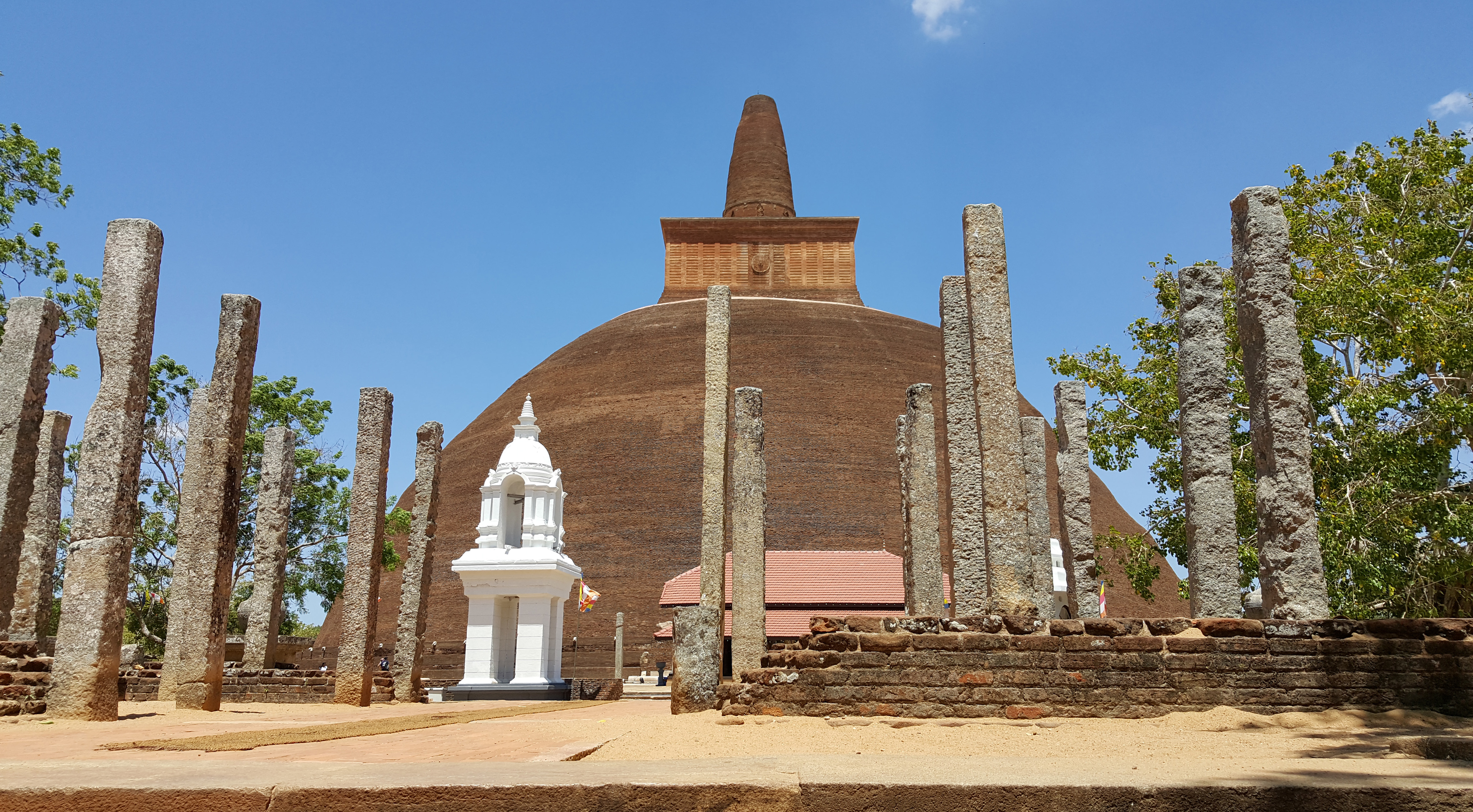
Abhayagiri Dagaba at Anuradhapura built in the 2nd Century BC

=== Sri Lankan Beginnings ===
Historically, the Buddhists of the Abhayagiri vihāra in Sri Lanka are known to have practiced Vajrayana and this might have had an influence on Southeast Asia through their missionary work in Java. According to Cousins, it is possible that Southern Esoteric Buddhism developed within the "orthodox" Mahavihara tradition of Sri Lanka, citing the 5th century Buddhist scholar Buddhaghosa's mention of secret texts (gulhagantham), those being texts that can only transmitted through a guru-disciple relationship, as well as other textual evidence from the Pali commentaries. This shows that esotericism was prevalent in Theravada prior the 5th century AD.

Cousins concludes that "It is quite possible that present-day Southern Esoteric Buddhism contains ideas and practices deriving from more than one of these sources. Nevertheless it is certainly premature to assume that it has its origins in unorthodox circles."

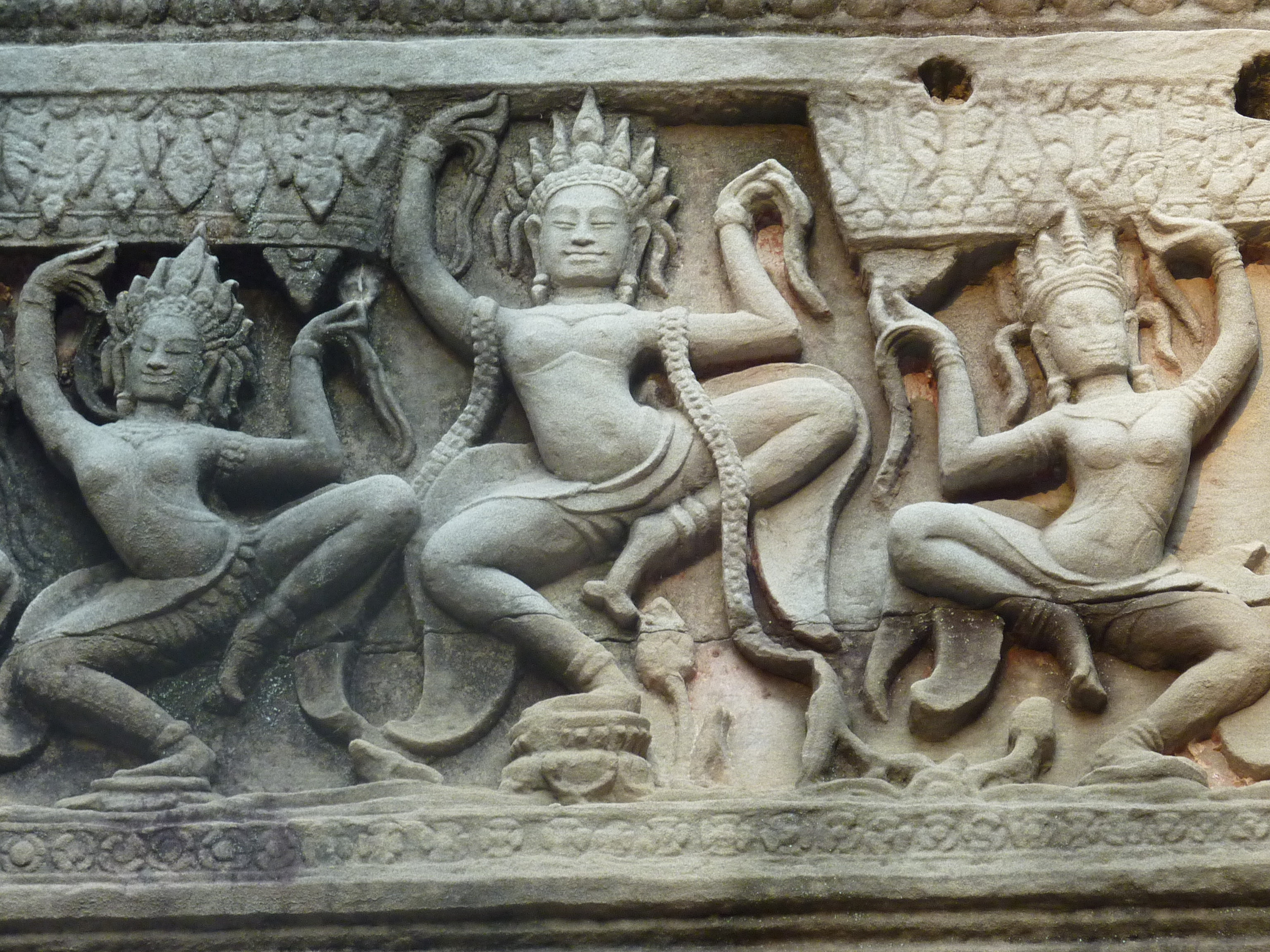
Dancing Apsaras (water spirits) from Preah Khan, Cambodia; an Angkorian Buddhist temple with Hindu elements.

=== Southeast Asian Influences ===
Ari Buddhism was a form of Buddhism practiced in the Bagan kingdom of Burma which also contained Tantric elements borrowed from India and local Nat (spirit) and Nāga worship. In many of Bizot's works there is some suggestion that the Buddhism of the Mon may have influenced the later Yogāvacara tradition. Southeast Asian Theravada was heavily influenced by the practice of Vajrayana Buddhism which flourished in the region during the time of the Khmer Empire and Srivijaya, but it's most likely that Vedic esoteric practices may have already been present in these regions due to the Indianization of Southeast Asia.

=== Flowering ===
The Yogāvacara tradition was a mainstream Buddhist tradition in Cambodia, Laos and Thailand well into the modern era. An inscription from Northern Thailand with esoteric elements has been dated to the Sukhothai Kingdom of the 16th century. Kate Crosby notes that this attestation makes the esoteric tradition earlier than “any other living meditation tradition in the contemporary Theravada world.”

=== Expansion (18th century) ===
During the reign of Rama I, the Thai Yogāvacara master Kai Thuean (1733-1823) was invited to Bangkok to be head of the meditation tradition there and was later made Sangharaja (head of the religious community) by Rama II of Siam in 1820. In Sri Lanka, a revival of Buddhist meditation in the 1750s saw a proliferation of Yogāvacara teachings and texts by Thai monks from the Ayutthaya Kingdom, one of which is the Yogāvacara's manual. Monks of the Siam Nikaya practiced these teachings and established several monasteries around Kandy. As late as the 1970s, Yogāvacara practices such as the rapid repetition of Araham were recorded in Sri Lanka.

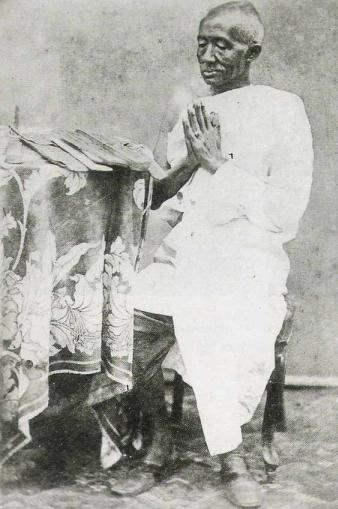
King Mongkut in white robes of a lay renunciant

=== Decline (19th-20th century) ===
The decline of the esoteric currents began with the rise of the reformed Buddhism in the 19th century, particularly the Dhammayuttika Nikaya established by King Rama IV (1851–1868) of the Thai Rattanakosin Kingdom in 1833, which was imported into Cambodia as it was a protectorate of the kingdom. In establishing the Dhammayuttika Nikaya, Rama IV emphasized the use of the Pali Canon as the main authority for monastic practices and also attempted to remove all superstitious and folk religious elements. The textual tradition followed by this reform movement was that of the Sri Lankan Mahavihara school (which itself dates from a set of 12th century reforms) which took the works of the 5th century scholar Buddhagosa as representing the orthodox interpretation and thus saw other Buddhist practices as unorthodox. The reforms tightened monastic discipline and led to a decline in the practices and production of texts which were not in line with Dhammayuttika Nikaya orthodoxy.

When Cambodia came under the rule of the French colonial empire, the French continued this policy of suppressing pre-reform Cambodian Buddhism. In spite of this, traditional esoteric practices survived in rural areas. The devastation of Cambodian religion by the Khmer Rouge and religious repression in Communist Laos also had a heavy toll on these traditions.

=== Legacy ===
Southern Esoteric Buddhist influences may be present in the practices and views of the modern Thai Dhammakaya movement.

Among the practitioners of Boran Kammatthana in the West are Samatha Trust, an organization dedicated to promoting the older Samatha tradition of meditation.

== Practices ==
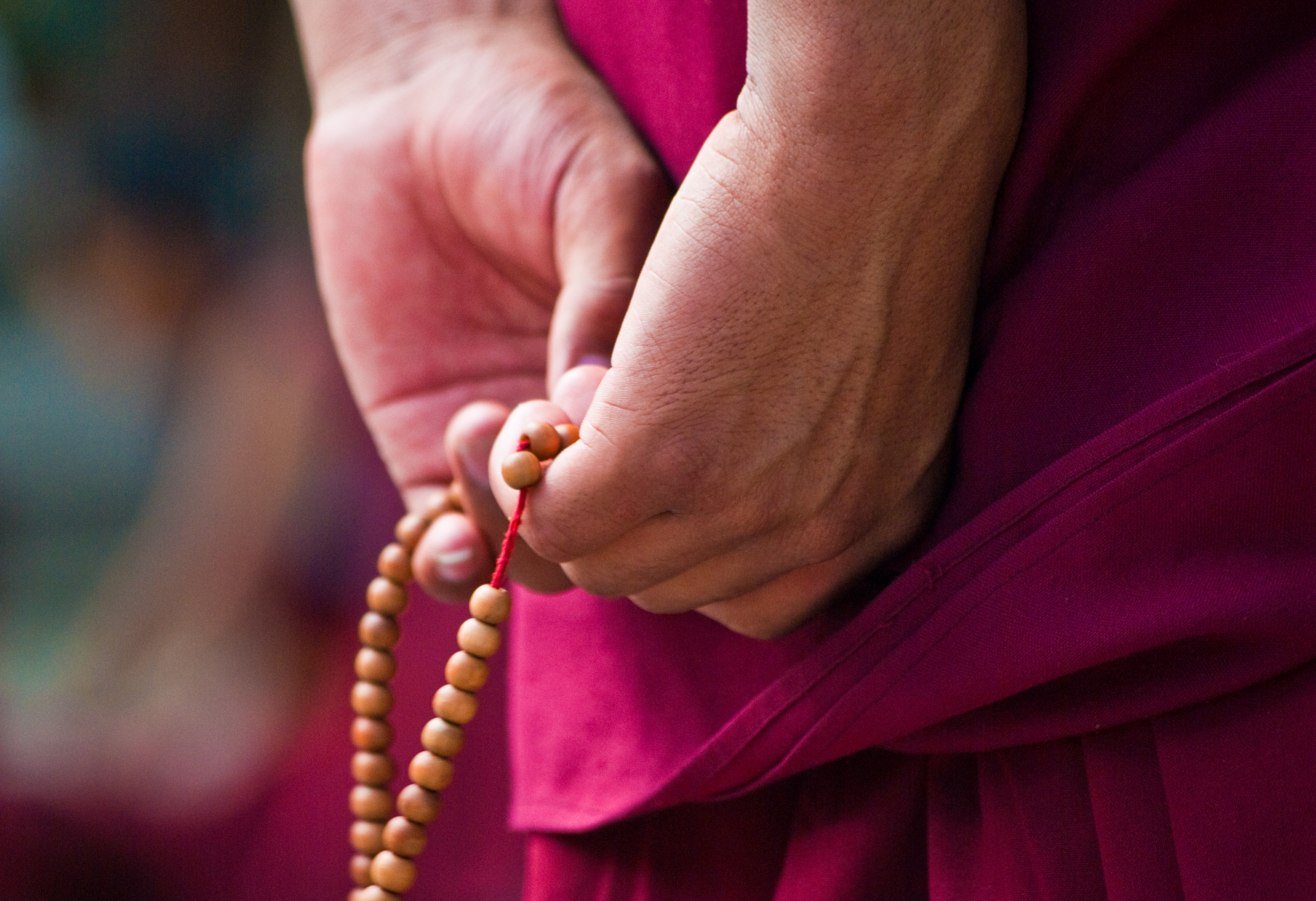
Buddhist prayer beads used for mantra recitation.

Cousins sees the practice of Southern Esoteric Buddhism as being defined by the mapping of inner and outer worlds, and calls it 'tantro-kabbalistic' mysticism. By this he means "a form of mysticism which utilizes a rather elaborate map of correspondences -between the human body, the cosmos and some kind of higher reality or knowledge. In the process it draws on the full resources of the widely-dispersed traditions of magic and the occult - letter, sound and number symbolism together with the use of structured patterns of shape or gesture."

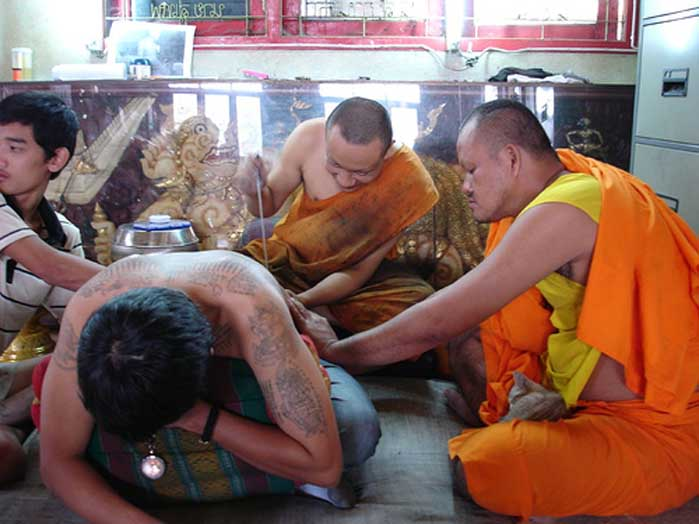
Yantra tattooing by monks of Wat Bang Phra

It contains certain South Asian religious practices such as the use of protective tattoos and amulets, the singing of protective Gathas, Thai astrology and the invocation of spirits and ghosts (such as Somdej Toh and Mae Nak). Today, magicians and forest monks using these techniques are most prevalent in the banks of the Mekong in Cambodia and Laos; they are believed to have magical powers, the divine eye and the ability to communicate with spirits. They practice Kasina meditation, mantra recitation, and ascetic practices (dhutanga). Thai forest monks such as Ajahn Lee Dhammadharo were also influenced by esoteric practices as is exemplified by his text "The Divine Mantra."

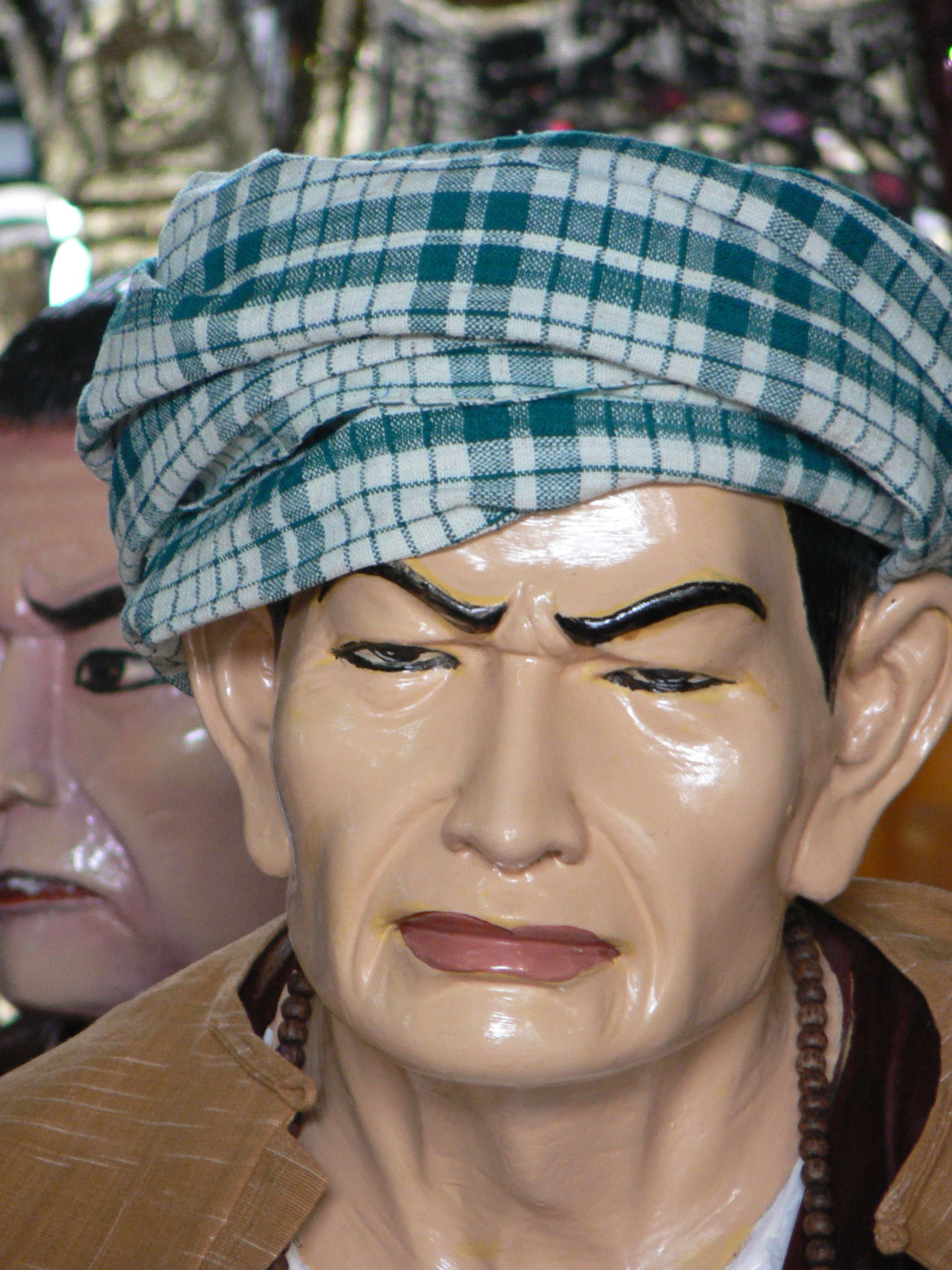
A Burmese statue of Bo Min Gaung, a famous weikza (wizard)

The practices of the Burmese Buddhist Weizza ("Wizards") who follow an esoteric system of occult practices (such as recitation of spells, samatha and alchemy) which are believed to lead to supernormal powers and a life of immortality might also be related to Southern Esoteric Buddhism.

Two of the most widely used sacred mantras in Yogāvacara texts are Namo Buddhaya ("Homage to the Buddha") and Araham ("Worthy One"). Here is an example of esoteric interpretation of the letter and number symbolism of Namo Buddhaya:

- NA, symbolizes the twelve virtues of the mother;
- MO, the twenty-one virtues of the father;
- BU, the six virtues of the king;
- DDHA., the seven virtues of the family;
- YA, the ten virtues of the teacher.

The recitation of these sacred phrases was used as a meditation practice. Robert Percival (in Ceylon from 1796 to 1800), described Buddhist mantra meditation thus: "To their girdles they wear suspended strings of beads made of a brownish or black wood; and mutter prayers as they go along."

In one text studied by Bizot, meditation includes the use of visualization of colored lights paired with sacred syllables located throughout the body and visions of the Buddha and a stupa at the top of mount Sumeru. Another text called the Ratanamala uses the itipi so formula for various purposes including spiritual protection, magical 'worldly' uses which are termed "left-hand", the transformation of the body into a kayasiddhi, a spiritual body, as well as for the pursuit of nirvana (termed "right-hand path").

Several studies by Bizot have also looked at certain "rebirthing" rituals which seem to have been common in pre-modern Cambodia. They included symbolic sacred syllables, the entrance into a cave which symbolized the womb, meditation on embryonic development, and the belief that this meditation would allow one's body to be reborn as the Dhammakaya. Another practice studied by Bizot was the use of yantras or sacred diagrams, which were made with Pali words and phrases and used as tattoos and on clothing.

In his study of the Saddavimala, a Yogāvacara text which was widely circulated in Southeast Asia (with over two hundred extant manuscripts), Bizot gives an outline of Yogāvacara practice:

"The yogavacara must:

1. memorise the stages of the embryonic development (with their alphabetic equivalents) which form the stages of his own formation;
2. through these stages build himself another body using the organs and constituents that are the letters, i.e. the portions of the Dhamma;
3. become conscious that this new body which he is going to produce outside of himself, first takes form within him, in his stomach at the level of the navel, taking the form of a Buddha the height of a thumb;
4. pursue and achieve in this life the construction of this immortal vehicle because it leads the person who possesses it to Nibbana, in that it takes the place of the spent physical form at the moment of death."

In contemporary Southern Buddhism, these practices are sometimes termed Boran Kammatthana (former practices) and are most widely seen in Cambodian Buddhism. They usually involve "the physical internalisation or manifestation of aspects of the Theravada path by incorporating them at points in the body between the nostril and navel."

Texts in the Boran Kammatthana tradition include:

- The Divine Mantra
- Dhammānudhammapaṭipatti
- Yogavacara's manual
- Saddavimala
- Ratanamala
- Jinapañjara
- Saddharmarathnakaraya
- Amatākaravaṇṇanā (c. 18th century) - According to Kate Crosby, this is one of the most extensive manuals of Esoteric Theravada meditation and was compiled by Kandyan Sinhalese students of Thai esoteric meditation masters.

Features of Yogāvacara and Boran Kammatthana practice include:

- Chanting of parittas for protection.
- Energy centers & channels like cakra/marma & nadi
- Use of encoded language and esoteric interpretation of Buddhist words, objects, myths, numbers and the Abhidhamma Pitaka texts
- The importance of initiation by a Guru (master)
- The use of the symbolism of embryology
- The practice of a type of meditation in which one visualizes and gives birth to a 'Buddha within' and the Dhammakaya.
- Chemistry of mercury as model for ongoing process of purification
- The practice of magic for healing, longevity, protection, etc.
- Alchemy
- Worship (puja) of Buddhas, Devas and Spirits
- A path which is open to all, monastics and lay persons
- Internal/external applications (Right hand-left hand)
- The importance of ritual and Sādhanā.
- Use of Yantra symbols.
- Use of amulets

== Major Figures in Borān kammaṭṭhāna ==
- Bo Bo Aung
- Bo Min Gaung
- Kyaikhtisaung Sayadaw
- Linn Nhyo Taryar
- Setkya Min
- Shin Iza Gawna
- Luang Pu Thuat
- Kai Thuean
- Somdej Toh
- Khruba Siwichai
- Phra Khuva Boonchum
- Luang Pu Sodh Candasaro
- Ajahn Lee Dhammadaro

== Southern Esoteric Traditions ==
- Yadaya
- Khom Thai script
- Thai Forest Tradition
- Dhammakaya meditation
- Weizza
- Rishi

== See also ==
- Buddhism in Myanmar
- Buddhism in Cambodia
- Buddhism in Thailand
- Buddhism in Laos
- Vajrayana
- Tantra
- Indonesian Esoteric Buddhism
- Azhaliism

== Sources ==
- Mettanando Bhikkhu (1999), Meditation and Healing in the Theravada Buddhist Order of Thailand and Laos, Hamburg (Ph.D. thesis).
- Woodward, EL. (1916), Manual of a Mystic being a translation from the Pali and Sinhalese Work entitled The Yogavachara's Manual, Pali Text Society, London, reprint 1982, ISBN 0-86013-003-7.
- Bernon, Olivier de (2000). Le manuel des maîtres de kammaṭṭhān : étude et présentation de rituels de méditation dans la tradition du bouddhisme khmer (Ph.D. thesis)
- Bizot F (1976). Le figuier à cinq branches, Recherches sur le bouddhisme khmer I, PEFEO, vol.CVI1, park
- Bizot F (1980), 'La grotte de la naissance', Recherches sur le bouddhisme khmer II, BEFEO, vol.LXVI1: 222-73, Paris.
- Bizot F (1981a). Le don de soi-même, Recherches sur le bouddhisme khmer III, PEFEO, vol.CXXX, Paris. ISBN 2-85539-730-8.
- Bizot F (1988), Les traditions de la pabbajja en Asie du Sud-Est, Recherches sur le bouddhisme khmer IV, Gijttingen. ISBN 3-525- 82454-8.
- Bizot F (1992). Le Chemin de Lankā, Textes bouddhiques du Cambodge no.f4, Collection de Ecole francaise de Extreme-Orient, Paris. ISSN 1150-2177, ISBN 2-85539-301-9.
- Bizot, F & E Lagirarde (1996). La pureté par les mots (Saddavimālā), Ecole francaise de Extreme-Orient, Paris, Chiang Mai. ISSN 1150-2177. ISBN 9782855 393049.
- Crosby,Kate (2013) Traditional Theravada Meditation and its Modern-Era Suppression Hong Kong: Buddha Dharma Centre of Hong Kong ISBN 9881682029
- Crosby, Kate (2019). Abhidhamma and Nimitta in Eighteenth-century Meditation Manuscripts from Sri Lanka: a Consideration of Orthodoxy and Heteropraxy in Boran Kammaṭṭhāna.
- Davids, Thomas William Rhys ed. (1896), The Yogavacara's manual of Indian mysticism as practised by Buddhists, London: PTS, Oxford University Press
- Foxeus, N. (2013). Esoteric Theravada Buddhism in Burma/Myanmar. Scripta Instituti Donneriani Aboensis, 25, 55–79. https://doi.org/10.30674/scripta.67433
- Foxeus, N. (2016). "I am the Buddha, the Buddha is Me": Concentration Meditation and Esoteric Modern Buddhism in Burma/Myanmar. Numen, 63(4), 411-445
- Skilton, Andrew & Choompolpaisal, Phibul (2016). The Ancient Theravāda Meditation System, Borān Kammaṭṭhāna: Ānāpānasati or ‘Mindfulness of The Breath’ in Kammatthan Majjima Baeb Lamdub.
