= Mogaung Kyawzwa =

Burmese deity

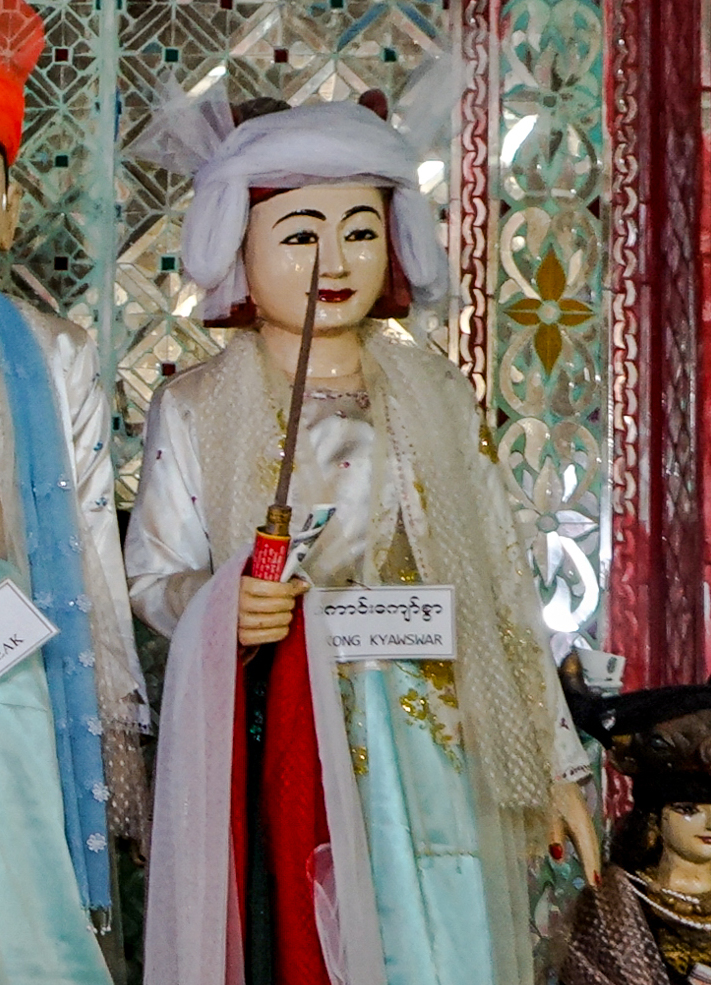
Statue of Mogaung Kyawzwa at a shrine in Mount Popa.

Mogaung Kyawzwa (Burmese: မိုးခေါင်ကျော်စွာ) is a Burmese deity (nat). He is venerated as a rain deity in Myanmar and is considered the most powerful nat among all Burmese nats.

== Legend ==
According to the legend, Mogaung Kyawzwa, originally known as Kyawzwa, is said to have been a devotee and apprentice of the renowned alchemist-monk, Shin Iza Gawna, also known as Master Goat-Bull. Kyawzwa was wealthy and donated all his property to support his master's pursuit of the philosopher's stone. Despite numerous failures, he fell into dire poverty. However, after the success of the philosopher's stone, Shin Iza Gawna caused gold and silver to rain down in Pagan, making Kyawzwa the richest man in Pagan. However, Shin Iza Gawna did not inform King Narathu, a significant supporter of his quest for the philosopher's stone, about the success of his endeavors. When Shin Iza Gawna was nearing the end of his mortal life, he offered Kyawzwa the chance to join him in attaining immortality, but Kyawzwa declined, wishing to remain close to his family. Shin Iza Gawna then went to the farms where Thawdar was working and offered her to accompany him. Thawdar agreed and left with her master. After their departure, Kyawzwa and his son Wuntha incurred the wrath of King Narathu and became targets of his anger. Under Narathu's orders, Kyawzwa and his son, Wuntha, were subjected to interrogation and torture, which led to their deaths. Following his demise, Kyawzwa was transformed into a nat, while Thawdar became a weizza.

Mogaung Kyawzwa, as he came to be known, was believed to have caused a severe drought by clearing the skies of rainclouds in his wrath. When the people sought to understand the cause of the drought, King Narathu confessed to having angered the spirit. To appease Mogaung Kyawzwa's fury, he demanded that a tug-of-war game be held in his honor. This event gave rise to a tradition in which tug-of-war games are played during droughts to invoke rain.
