= Hsinbyume =

Hsinbyume ဆင်ဖြူရှင်မယ်

Princess consort of Burma
- Tenure: 18 April 1808 – 3 November 1812
- Successor: Nanmadaw Me Nu
- Born: 1789; Ava
- Died: 3 November 1812 (aged 22–23); Mingun
- Consort: Bagyidaw
- Issue: Setkya Mintha
Regnal name
- Sīrisumahācandādevī
- House: Konbaung
- Father: Prince of Pyay
- Mother: Princess of Myedu
- Religion: Theravada Buddhism

Princess Hsinbyume (Burmese: ဆင်ဖြူရှင်မယ်; lit. 'White Elephant Lady') was crown princess of Burma from 1808 to 1812, and first wife of King Bagyidaw of Konbaung dynasty. She married Bagyidaw when he was Prince of Sagaing on 9 February 1803. Hsinbyume and the King Bagyidaw were cousins, as they both were the grandchildren of King Bodawpaya.

== Life ==
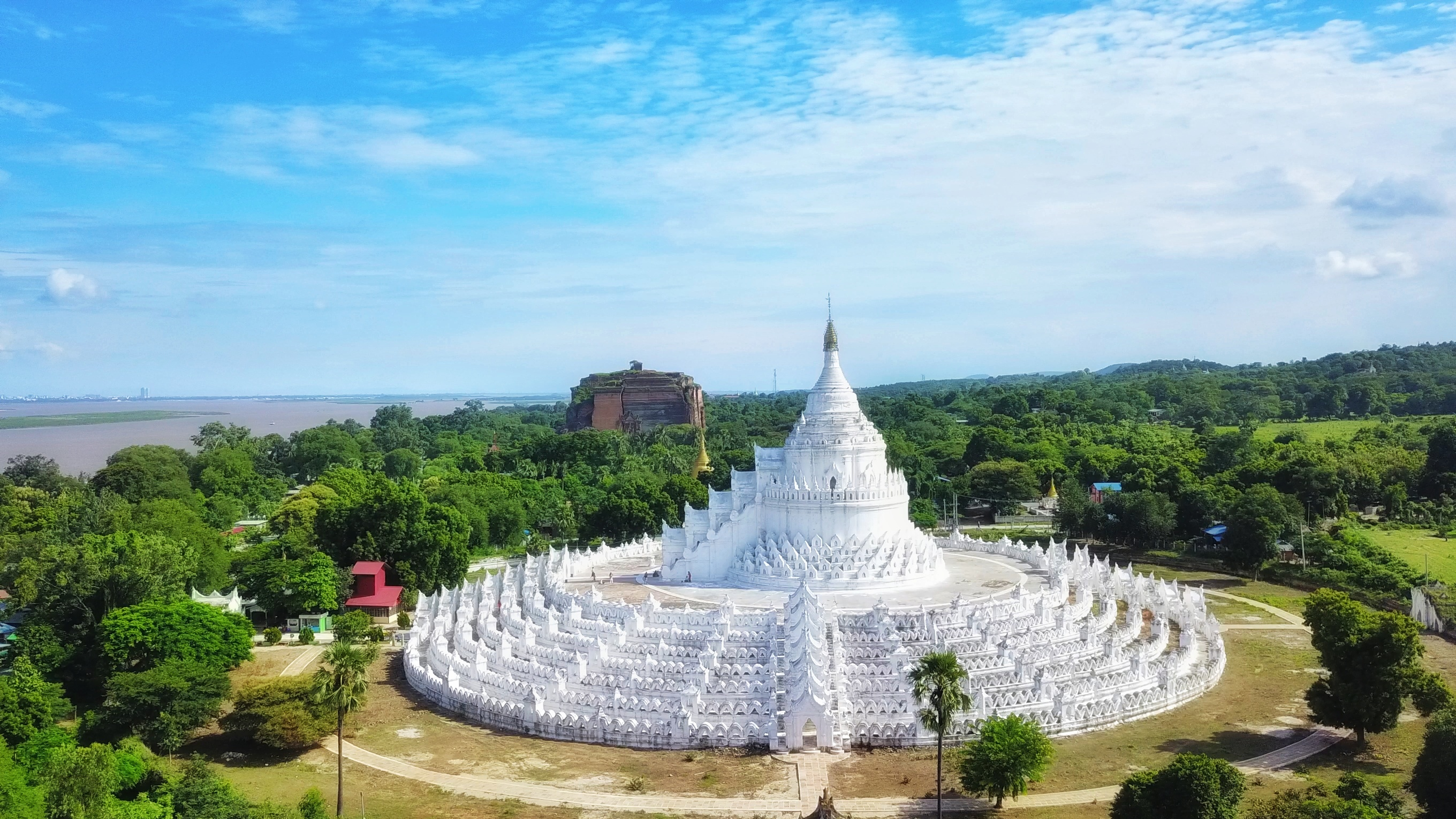
Hsinbyume Pagoda, Mingun

Hsinpyume was a daughter of Prince of Pyay Sīridhammarājā (a son of King Bodawpaya) and his consort Princess of Myedu. She was wedded to the 18-year-old Prince of Sagaing on 9 February 1803. Her full regnal title was Sīrisumahācandādevī. She became the Crown Princess when her husband, Prince of Sagaing, was selected as Crown Prince by his grandfather, King Bodawpaya, in 1808.

In 1812, Hsinbyume died seven days after the birth of Setkya Mintha in Mingun near Ava. The crown prince built a beautiful white stupa in memory of his first wife, named Hsinbyume Pagoda at Mingun. He took on five more queens as crown prince (of the eventual number of 23 queens). He promoted his third wife Me Nu as new Crown Princess and later chief queen when Bagyidaw ascended the throne on 5 June 1819.

Her son, Setkya Mintha, was executed by King Tharrawaddy (the successor to his elder brother Bagyidaw) on 4 April 1837.
