= Setkya Min =

Pe Khin မောင်ဖေခင်
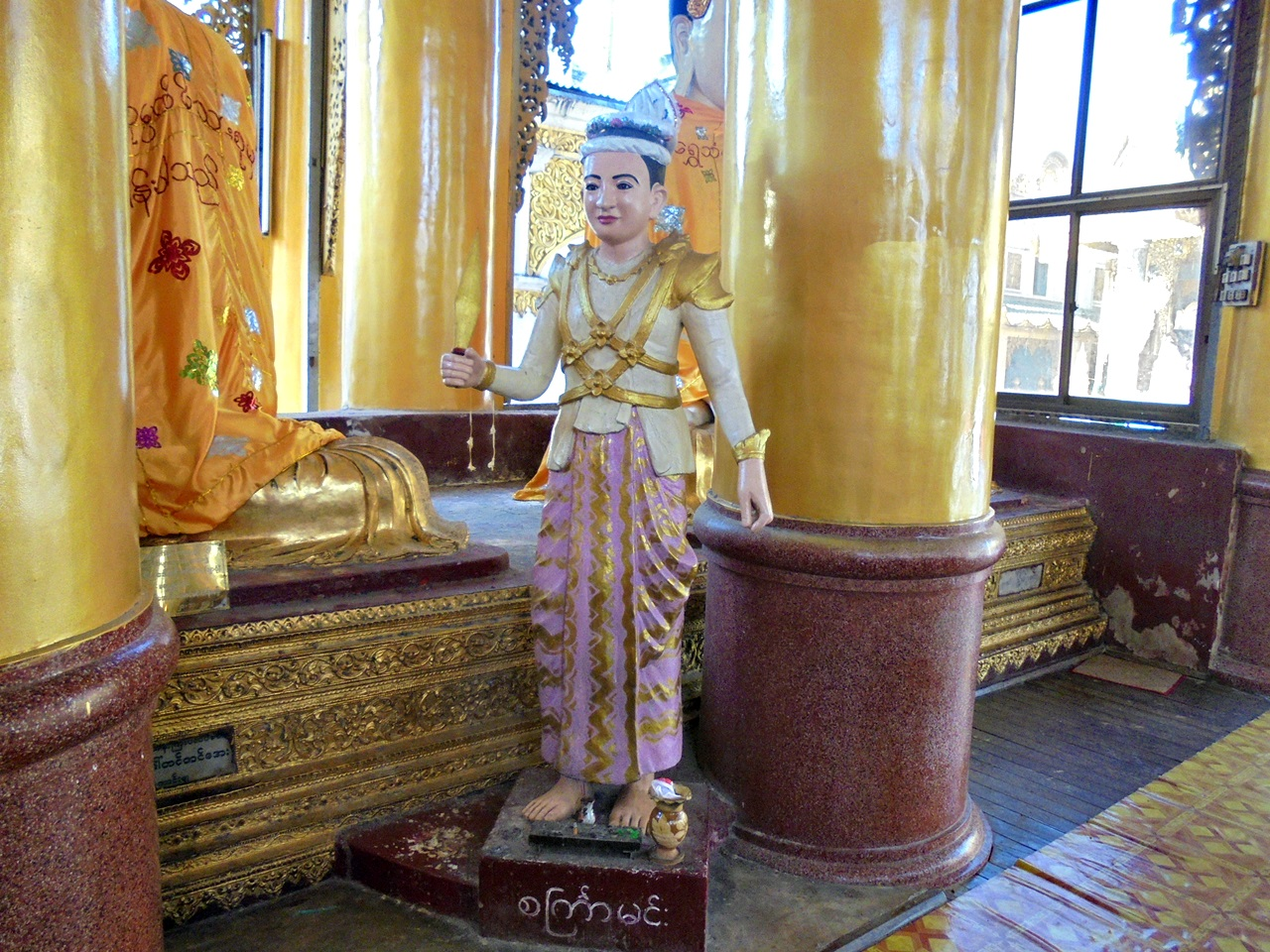
- Statue of Setkya Min

Heir Apparent of Burma Prince of Nyaungyan
- Reign: 1819 – 1837
- Successor: Tharrawaddy Min
- Born: Maung Pe Khin; 27 October 1812; Mingun
- Died: 15 April 1838 (aged 25); Amarapura
- Spouse: Shwetantin Princess
- Issue: Me Tin Gyi
Regnal name
- Mahāsīhasūra Dhammarāja
- House: Konbaung
- Father: Bagyidaw
- Mother: Hsinbyume
- Religion: Theravada Buddhism

Maha Thiha Thura Dhammaraja (Burmese: မဟာသီဟသူရဓမ္မရာဇာ, Pali: Mahāsīhasūra dhammarājā; born Phe Khin; 27 October 1812 – 4 April 1839), commonly known as Setkya Min (Sekkyaa Minn, Burmese: စကြာမင်း; meaning Chakravarti) or the Prince of Nyaungyan (Burmese: ညောင်ရမ်းမင်းသား), was an heir apparent of Burma and son of King Bagyidaw and his consort Hsinbyume. He is worshipped as a weizza along with Bo Bo Aung.

== Life ==
Maung Phe Khin (မောင်ဖေခင်) was born on 27 October 1812 in Mingun, near Ava, to the Crown Prince of Sagaing (who later became King Bagyidaw) and Hsinbyume. Miraculous events were reported at his birth and his body was said to bear the signs of a future world emperor. King Bodawpaya, his great-grandfather, conferred the title of Thatoe Minhla Shwetaung (သတိုးမင်းလှရွှေတောင်) to him, and gave him the fiefdom of Nyaungyan. His mother died seven days after giving birth. He is recorded as having been very popular with the people and called Sekkyaa Min by them. After Burma's defeat in the First Anglo-Burmese War, it was hoped that he would succeed his father on the throne, drive out the British, and usher in an era of prosperity for Burma and Buddhism.

Setkya Min married Shwetantin Princess, who gave birth to a daughter named Me Tin Gyi. Shwetantin Princess was a daughter of the Prince of Hlaing (a son of King Bodawpaya) and the Princess of Danubyu (a daughter of King Bodawpaya). Therefore, Setkya Prince and Shwetantin Princess were half-siblings.

When Bagyidaw was overthrown by his brother King Tharrawaddy, Setkya Min was executed on 15 April 1838. He was thrown into a river in a velvet sack - an execution method favored by Burmese royalty.

== Veneration ==
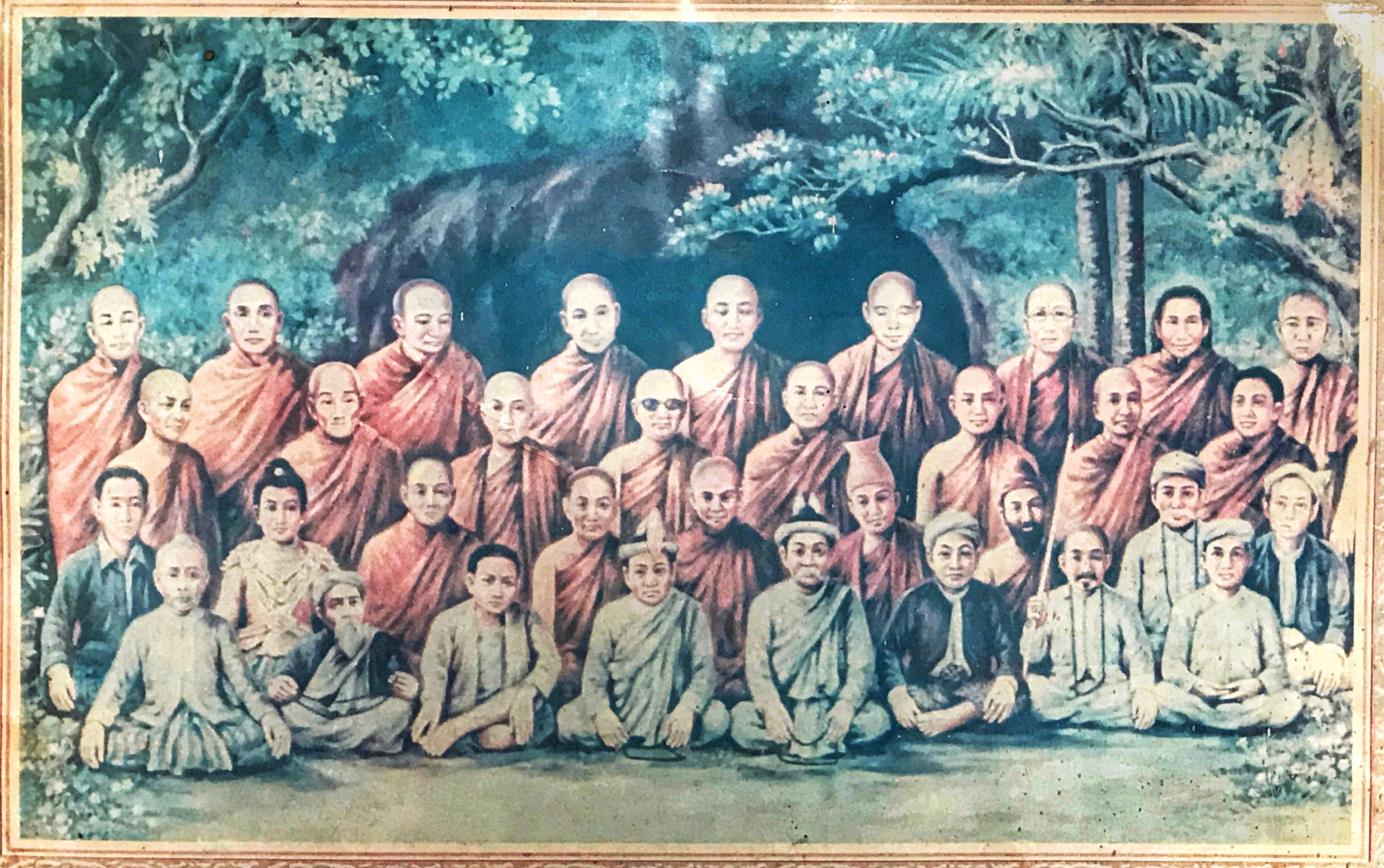
Setkya Min is a notable weizza

Many believed Setkya Min had not been drowned. They said that he had been miraculously rescued by the powerful weizza Bo Bo Aung, who brought him to a hidden sanctuary where he learned esoteric practices and eventually became a weizza himself. Using his spiritual powers, Bo Bo Aung transported Setkya Min to the heaven where future kings are said to bide their time before returning to Earth. Therefore, this legend is an example of the sleeping hero.

== Anti-colonial movement ==
Setkya Min is associated with the anti-colonial movement in Burma. Throughout most of the colonial era, the figure of Setkya Min represented anti-colonial resistance, and a series of rebellions were led by people claiming to be this mysterious personage. After the British had annexed all of Burma and deposed the last Burmese king in 1885, these rebellions largely sought to restore the monarchy and the king to his role as the foremost promoter and supporter of the Buddha's Sasana.
