= Princess Myedu =

Thiri Tilawka Mahabhata Thu Ratana Devi

Princess of Myedu
- Born: Ma Ohnn unknown Ava
- Died: unknown
- Husband: Prince of Pyay
- Issue: Hsinbyume
Regnal name
- Sritilokamahābhattāratānā devī
- House: Konbaung
- Father: Bodawpaya
- Mother: Me Lun Me
- Religion: Theravada Buddhism

Thiri Tilawka Mahabhata Thu Ratana Devi (Burmese: သီရိတိလောက မဟာဘတ္တာသုရတနာဒေဝီ; Pali: Sīritiloka Mahābhattā Suratanādevī), commonly known as the Princess of Myedu (Burmese: မြေဒူးမင်းသမီး) was a royal princess of Ava during the Konbaung dynasty of Burma. She was the youngest daughter of King Bodawpaya and Chief Queen Me Lun Me (မယ်လွန်းမယ်). She was granted the appanages of Myedu.

She married her half brother, Prince of Pyay. Her given name was Ma Ohnn, and her regal title was Sīritiloka Mahābhattā Suratanādevī.

== Biography ==
King Bodawpaya and Chief Queen had three daughters:

- Princess of Kanni (Amigyi) Sri mahāratanā devī,
- Princess of Taungdwingyi (Ma Kay) Sri mahātilokaratanā devī,
- Princess of Myaydoo (Ma Ohnn) Sri tilokamahābhattāratnā devī.

Her husband, Prince of Pyay, was the youngest among two sons of King Bodawpaya and Shin Lunthu (ရှင်လွန်းသူ), Queen of the Northern Palace. His eldest brother was Crown Prince of Shwedaung (အိမ်ရှေ့စံ ရွှေတောင်မင်းသား). Prince of Pyay and Princess of Myaydoo had a daughter called Hsinbyume who was the first consort of the crown-prince-to-be Prince of Sagaing, who later became King Bagyidaw.
