= Yogāvacara's manual =

The Yogāvacara's manual is a Theravada Buddhist meditation manual notable for its unique and unorthodox features, such as the use of mental images of the elements, the mantra "A-RA-HAṀ", and the use of a candle flame for meditation. It has been loosely dated from the 16th to the 17th century.

== Overview ==
The text is addressed to a "Yogāvacara", meaning any practitioner of Buddhist meditation, and hence it serves as a practical meditation handbook.

The manual covers a wide range of meditative practices, combining orthodox Theravāda material with esoteric methods. It contains the ten recollections (anussati), the brahmavihara meditations, the five forms of pīti (joy), the four formless absorptions (arūpajhāna), the development of nimittas, and ten stages of vipassanā-ñāṇa.

One distinctive exercise is a form of breath meditation in which the meditator cultivates a bright perception of a nimitta at the tip of the nose, then moves it down through the body to the heart and the navel. The manual also prescribes contemplations using the flame of a candle, the kasina meditation devices, and visualized images of the four elements (mahābhūta).

== Manuscript history ==
The single known Pali and Sinhalese manuscript was discovered in 1893 at Bamabara-walla Vihara in Sri Lanka by Anagarika Dharmapala. T.W. Rhys Davids of the Pali Text Society published the first English translation in 1896 under the title The Yogāvacara’s Manual. A later rendering was made by F.L. Woodward in 1916 under the title Manual of a Mystic. The surviving manuscript does not provide the author’s name or an original title.

== Scholarly interpretations ==
Some scholars, such as François Bizot, have argued that the manual reflects influence from the esoteric Theravāda (Bōran Kammaṭṭhāna) tradition, pointing to its use of mantras, visualizations, and yogic imagery. Others, such as Justin Thomas McDaniel, have been more cautious, suggesting that while the text is unusual, clear links to tantric influence remain unproven.

Caroline Rhys Davids observed that in the 16th and 17th centuries, monks from Siam (modern-day Thailand) were invited by Kandyan kings to help revive Buddhism in Sri Lanka. She suggested that the manual may derive from this cross-cultural transmission of esoteric meditation practices.

== Legacy ==
The Yogāvacara's Manual is considered an important historical witness to pre-reform Theravāda meditation traditions. Its unusual combination of canonical material, visualization practices, and mantra use has made it a key source for the study of Southeast Asian Buddhist meditation, and it is frequently compared with later Thai meditation manuals from the Wat Ratchasittharam and Wat Pradu Songtham traditions of the Ayutthaya period.

== See also ==
- Vimuttimagga
- Visuddhimagga
- Samatha
- Vipassana
- Southern Esoteric Buddhism

== Notes ==
=== References ===
- Rhys Davids, T.W. (1896), The Yogavacara's Manual of Indian Mysticism, London, Oxford University Press.
- Woodward, EL. (1916), Manual of a Mystic being a translation from the Pali and Sinhalese Work entitled The Yogavachara's Manual, Pali Text Society, London, reprint 1982, ISBN 0-86013-003-7.
