= Shin Iza Gawna =

Burmese weizza

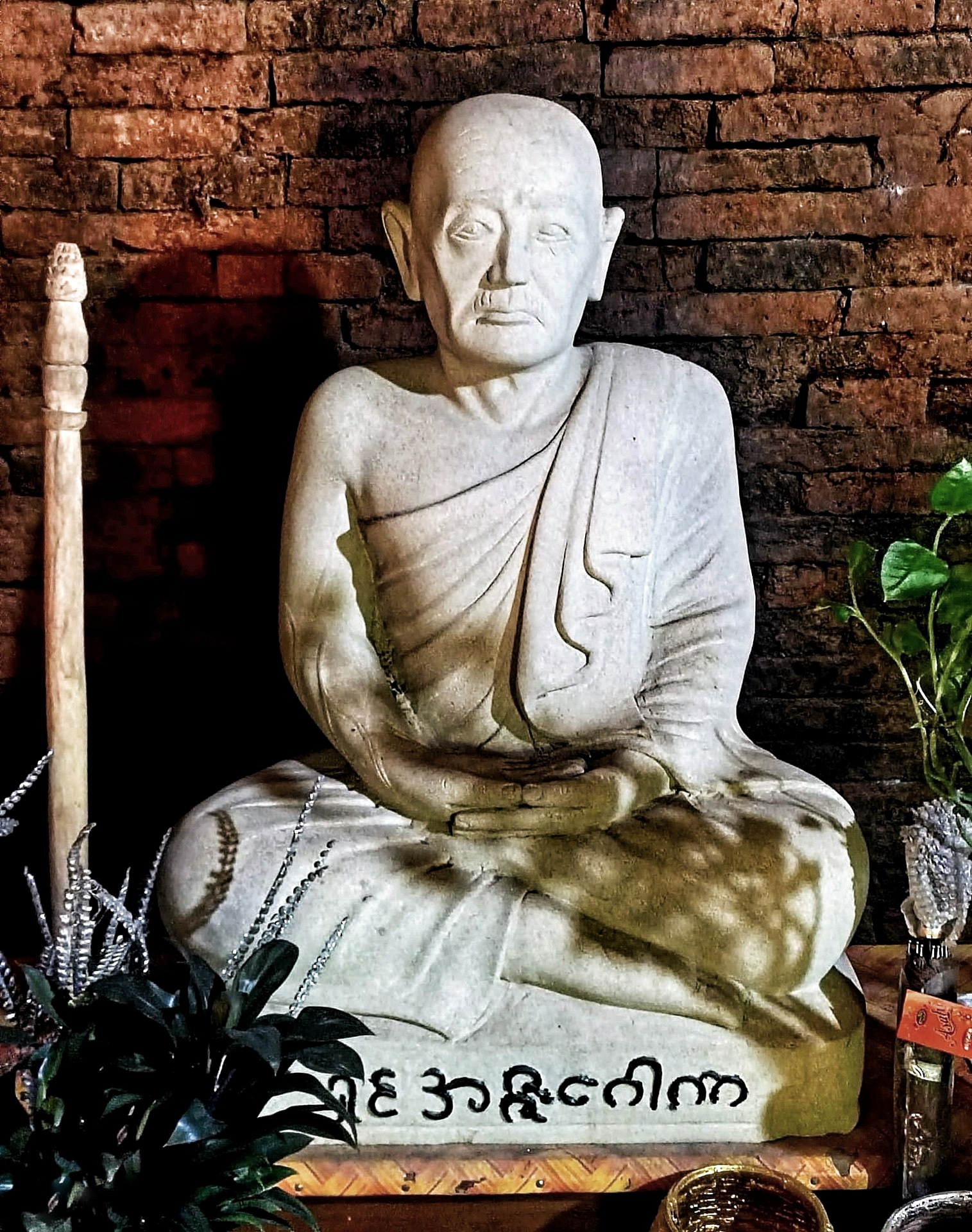
Statue of Shin Iza Gawna in Pagan

Shin Iza Gawna (Burmese: ရှင်အဇ္ဇဂေါဏ), also known as Shinmahtee Sayadaw (Burmese: ရှင်မထီးဆရာတော်), is a prominent Burmese weizza who lived during the Pagan era. After achieving success with the philosopher's stone, Shin Iza Gawna is said to have caused gold and silver to rain down in Pagan. This miraculous event led to significant wealth for his followers and is believed to be the origin of the construction of thousands of pagodas in Pagan.

== Legend ==
According to legend, the monk was originally known as Shinmahtee Sayadaw during the reign of King Alaungsithu of Pagan. Some sources suggest that Shin Iza Gawna lived during the reign of King Thamoddarit, the legendary founder of the Pagan Kingdom. He was skilled in alchemy and sought to attain the philosopher's stone. To support his quest, many devotees, including King Narathu, donated their properties and gems to him. However, after numerous failures, many of his followers fell into dire poverty. This angered King Narathu, who eventually ordered that the monk's eyes be gouged out.

The monk, feeling disappointed with his philosopher's stone, instructed one of his disciples residing at the monastery to discard it in the toilet. When the disciple followed his orders and discarded it, the stone suddenly became successful, glowing brilliantly with radiant light. The true philosopher's stone had to be soaked in "liquid of feces", but due to a misunderstanding, it was mistakenly soaked in "water used for soaking yarn or thread", because liquid of feces (ချီးရည်) and water used for soaking yarn (ချည်ရည်) are homonyms in Burmese, leading to repeated failures. The monk then cleansed the philosopher's stone with fragrant substances. Afterward, he instructed a disciple to go to the market and purchase a pair of eyes. However, as it was getting late, only a goat's eye and a cow's eye were available. The monk placed the two animal eyes into his eye sockets and rubbed them with the philosopher's stone, which restored his vision. From then on, the monk became known as 'Shin Iza Gawna' (where Iza means goat and Gawna means cow).

After the success of the philosopher's stone, Shin Iza Gawna caused gold and silver to rain down in Pagan, making his followers wealthy. However, he did not inform King Narathu of his success. As Shin Iza Gawna neared the end of his mortal life, he offered one of his trusted followers, Kyawzwa, the chance to join him in attaining immortality. Kyawzwa declined, wishing to remain close to his family. Shin Iza Gawna then went to Thawdar, Kyawzwa's wife, and invited her to accompany him. Thawdar agreed and left with her master. After their departure, Kyawzwa and his son Wuntha became targets of King Narathu’s anger and were ultimately tortured to death. Following his death, Kyawzwa was transformed into a nat, while Thawdar became a weizza.

It is believed that in ancient times, there were 4,446,733 stupas in Pagan. The ability to build and worship such a vast number of stupas is thought to be due to Shin Iza Gawna's success in creating the philosopher's stone, which enabled devotees to make offerings and caused gold and silver to rain down in Pagan. It is said that during that time, even a poor huntress could donate a stupa thanks to the blessings of Shin Iza Gawna.

== Legacy ==
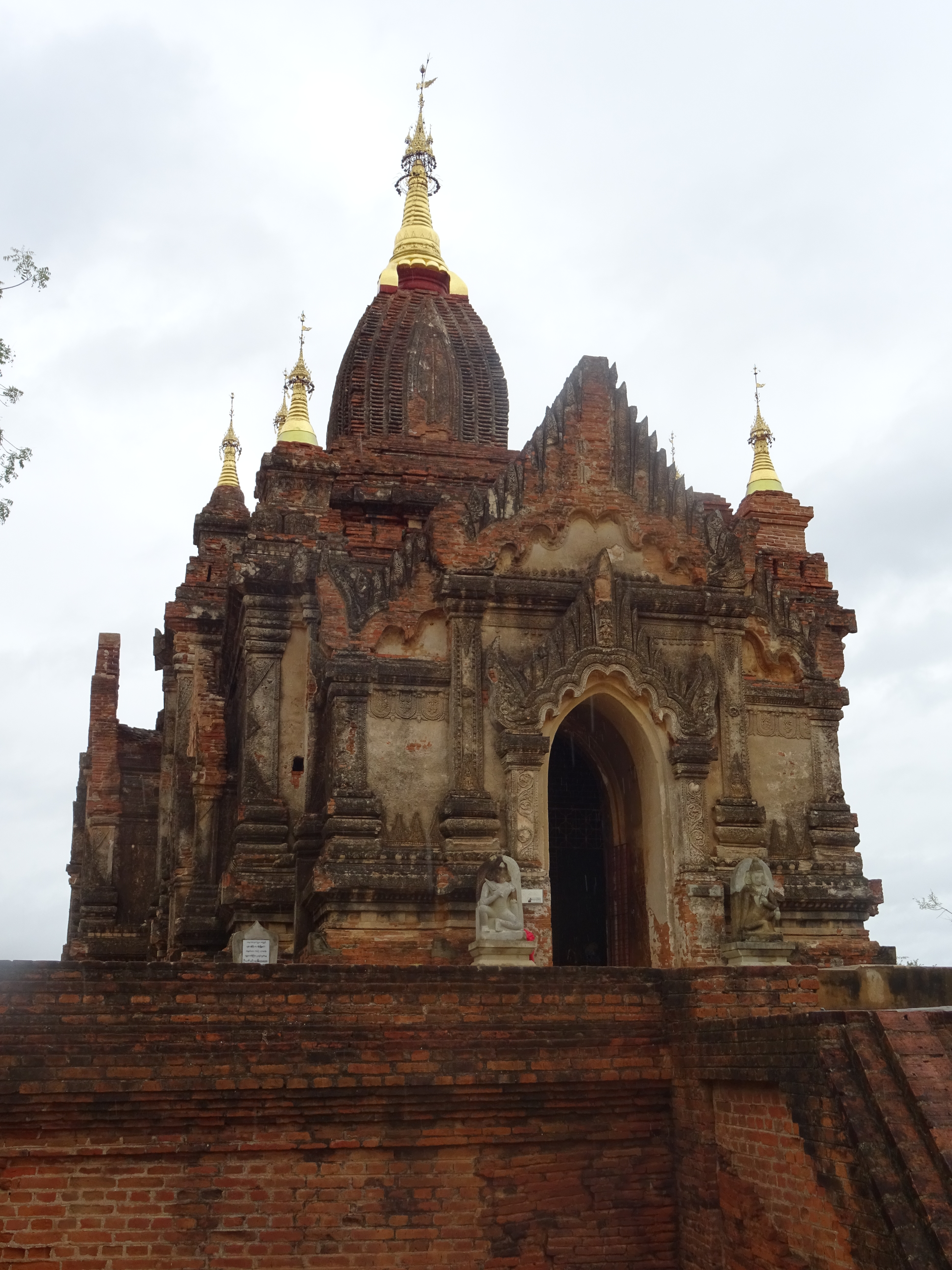
Iza Gawna Pagoda in Nyaung-U

In Nyaung-U, there is a Buddhist temple known as Iza Gawna Pagoda. According to stone inscriptions, the pagoda was established by Maha Thamangyi, a court official who served under King Kyaswa, and his wife. However, the pagoda was later renamed Iza Gawna Pagoda in honor of Shin Iza Gawna, as artifacts associated with alchemy were discovered within the pagoda.

At Shwedagon Pagoda, there is an Iza Gawna Buddhist Image in the Iza Gawna prayer hall, which is believed to have been donated by Shin Iza Gawna.

In Myingun, there is a temple known as Lemyetna Cave Pagoda. It is believed that this cave pagoda was established by Shin Iza Gawna, who is said to have meditated in the cave according to the pagoda's history.
