= Yai Damrongthammasan =

Khunying Yai Damrongthammasan (1886–1944) was a Thai noble who grew up in Bangkok. She retired to a Buddhist monastery when her husband, a prominent judge, died. She met with women at the temple of Wat Sattanat Pariwat and is thought to have written the respected text, Dhammānudhammapaṭipatti (Practice in Perfect Conformity with the Dhamma), which was published anonymously from 1932 to 1934.
