= Bo Min Gaung =

Burmese weizza

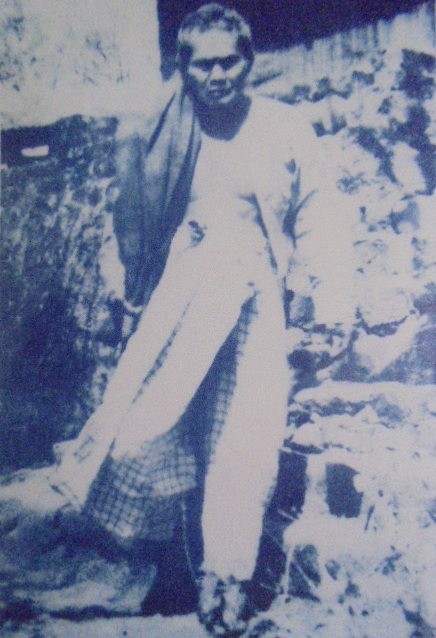
Bo Min Gaung (also known as Aung Min Gaung)

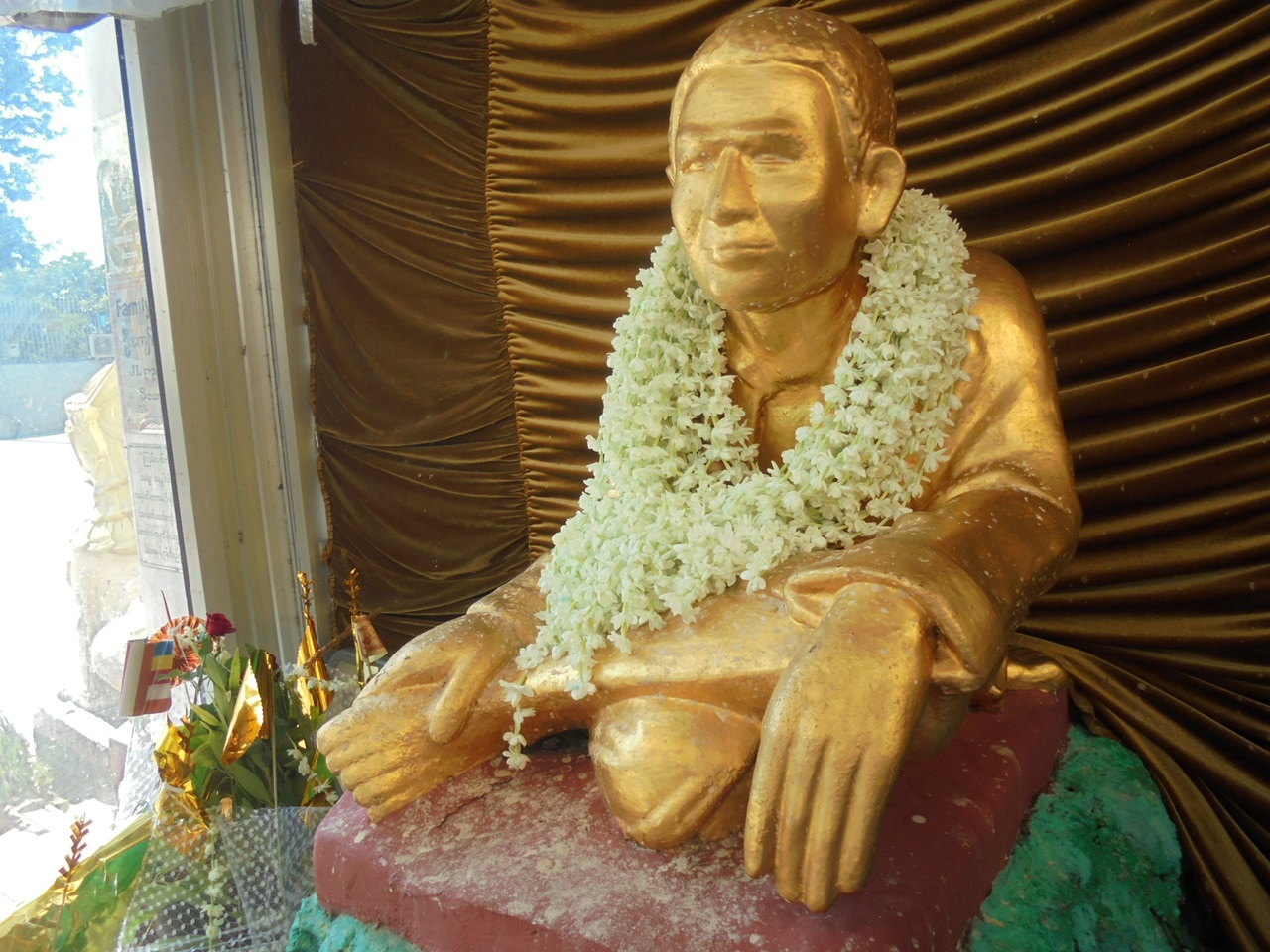
Statue of Bo Min Gaung at Shwedagon Pagoda (between Naungdawgyi Pagoda and Dhammazedi Inscription)

Bo Min Gaung (Burmese: ဘိုးမင်းခေါင်; 2 May 1880 – 5 September 1952), also known as Aung Min Gaung (Burmese: အောင်မင်းခေါင်), was a prominent 20th-century weizza (wizard-saint) and spiritual figure in Myanmar. He is one of the most venerated esoteric saints in modern Burmese Buddhism, believed to possess miraculous powers and regarded as both a protector of the Buddhist faith and a champion of the Burmese people.

== Early life ==
Bo Min Gaung was born Maung Bo Aung on 2 May 1880 (10th waxing of Kason 1242 ME) in Sin Myint Village, east of Mount Popa, Kyaukpadaung Township, Mandalay Region, during the late Konbaung Dynasty. His parents were U Maung Pu and Daw Min Thit. He was the second of five children, with siblings U Bo Thaung, U Htun Maung, U Bo Saung, and Daw Wai Myint.

== Monastic life ==
As a boy he ordained as a novice and later became a monk under the name U Āciṇṇa (Burmese: ဦးအာစိဏ္ဏ). After three rain retreats, he disrobed and returned to lay life, adopting the name Min Khaung. Relatives thought him eccentric or mad, but he displayed supernatural feats—reviving chickens, riding logs upstream, taming tigers, walking across the Irrawaddy River, sleeping on banana leaves, multiplying his body, uprooting trees with one hand, and surviving months without food.

He was later arrested by police chief U Kywat and imprisoned at Kyaukpadaung, but according to legend, he escaped without unlocking the cell door.

== Religious mission ==
Bo Min Gaung gained fame for distributing a “First Exhortation Letter” (ပထမမန်ဂိုဏ်းတော်ကြီးလုံ့ဆော်စာ), calling for the construction of nine-cubit pagodas as protective shrines:

"ဘုရားလေးငယ်ငယ် (Little pagoda)

ကိုးတောင်ပြည့်တည် (Built nine cubits pagoda) ငယ်သာငယ် ကယ်ဆယ်မယ့်ဘုရား (Although small, it is a pagoda that will save people) ကပ်ကိုရယ် ခုရယ်ကူးအောင်ကွယ် (Maybe overcome calamities)

ဖူးကြအများ" (Worship pagoda)

As a result, devotees from over 80 cities and 4,000 villages built such pagodas across the country. In 1952, he oversaw the construction of the “Pyi Lone Chan Thar Kat Kyaw” Pagoda at Mount Popa, dedicated to national prosperity and protection from calamities.

== Death ==
Bo Min Gaung died at Mount Popa on 5 September 1952 (2nd waning of Tawthalin 1314 ME) at 4:20 pm. The date is commemorated annually as the “day that Bo Min Gaung left” (Burmese: အဘထွက်ပွဲနေ့).

== Beliefs and historical miracles ==
Like the earlier weizza Bo Bo Aung, according to historical accounts, Bo Min Gaung was believed have used his magical powers to help those in distress, protect the virtuous, and oppose evil-doers. He is sometimes referred to as “Bo Aung Min Gaung.” Accounts describe him as a devout Buddhist who promoted the endurance of the sāsana (Buddhist religion).

Tradition identifies him with King Okkalapa, donor of the Shwedagon Pagoda, and links him to the wealthy patron U Ba Oo of Yangon. Local lore also associates him with Prince Nanda and Shin Moe Nyo.

His miraculous acts became legendary: walking across water, multiplying his form, control all elements manipulation or appearing in photographs only when taken by certain devotees. Followers claimed he could bestow dreams, wealth, and protection.

== Veneration ==
Bo Min Gaung is one of the most venerated weizza among Burmese Buddhists, especially those practicing esoteric Buddhism. Believers hold that he continues to guide the faithful, sometimes speaking through mediums. Some regard him as an immortal or a future king, and the Dhammazedi Gaing sect reveres him as founder and future Buddha.

He is honored across Myanmar. The hut where he lived at Bodhi Hill Pagoda in Yangon, and his relics, are preserved. His statues are enshrined at major pagodas including the Shwedagon.

== Hagiography and past lives ==
Burmese hagiographies claim his past incarnations included:

- Ajita, a novice monk in the time of the Buddha
- the hermit Dibbacakkhu
- King Okkalapa of Yangon
- Shin Arahan of Pagan
- King Dhammazedi of Hanthawaddy
- King Bodawpaya of Konbaung
- Prince Sagaing Mintha

== Respect and kinship ==
Among rural Burmese, Bo Min Gaung is often referred to as “Aba Bo Min Gaung” (Father or Grandfather). Many regard him as a family protector. He is also revered for mastery of vipassanā meditation.

== Nationalist associations ==
Some scholars link Bo Min Gaung to the Burmese nationalist movement of the early 20th century, where he was regarded as a symbolic guardian of the nation and Buddhism.

== Legacy ==
Bo Min Gaung remains a central figure in modern Burmese spiritual life. His image appears on household altars, and his stories are retold as examples of miraculous power, moral virtue, and protection of the Buddhist faith.

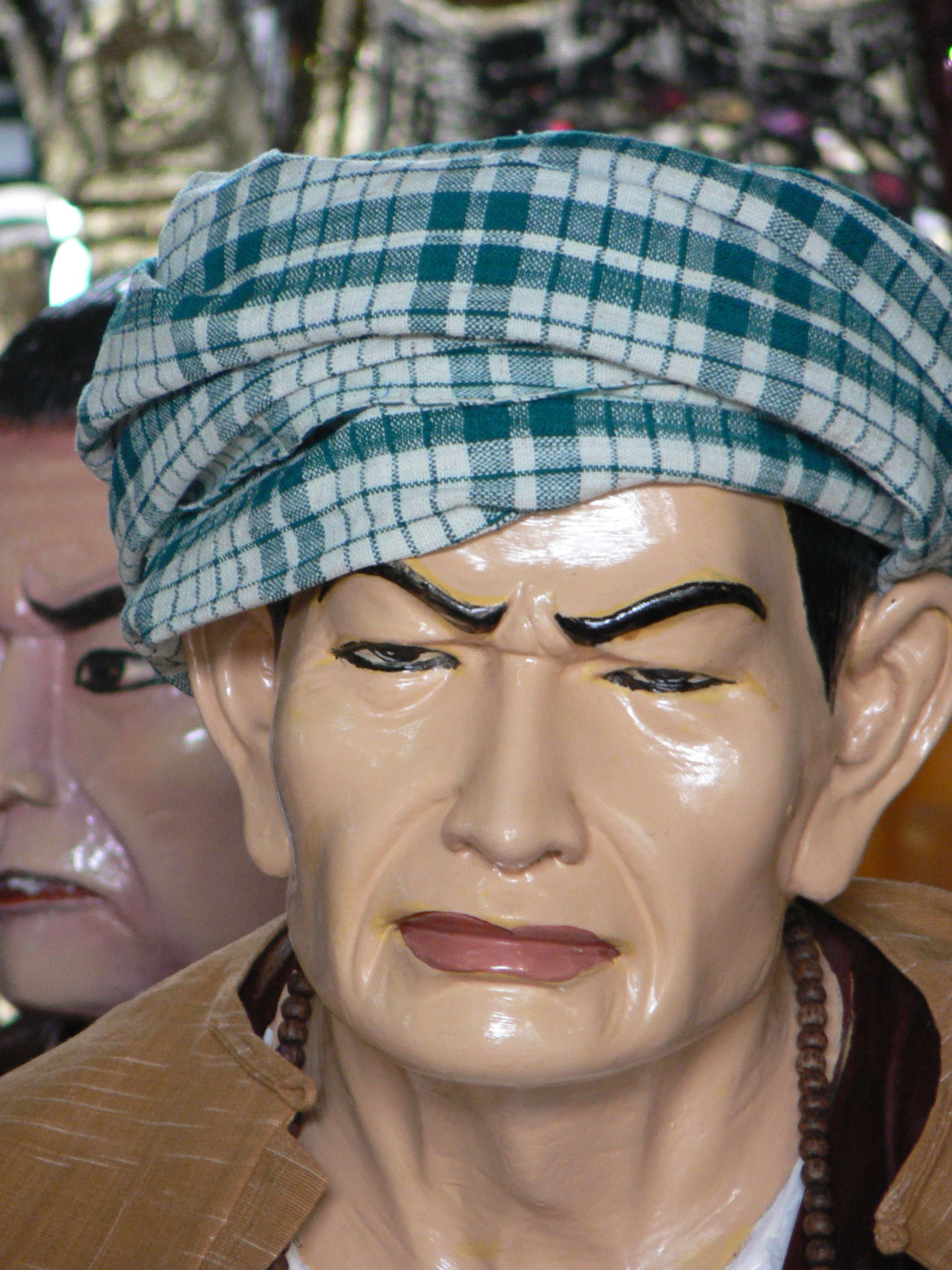
A statue of Bo Min Gaung at Mount Popa

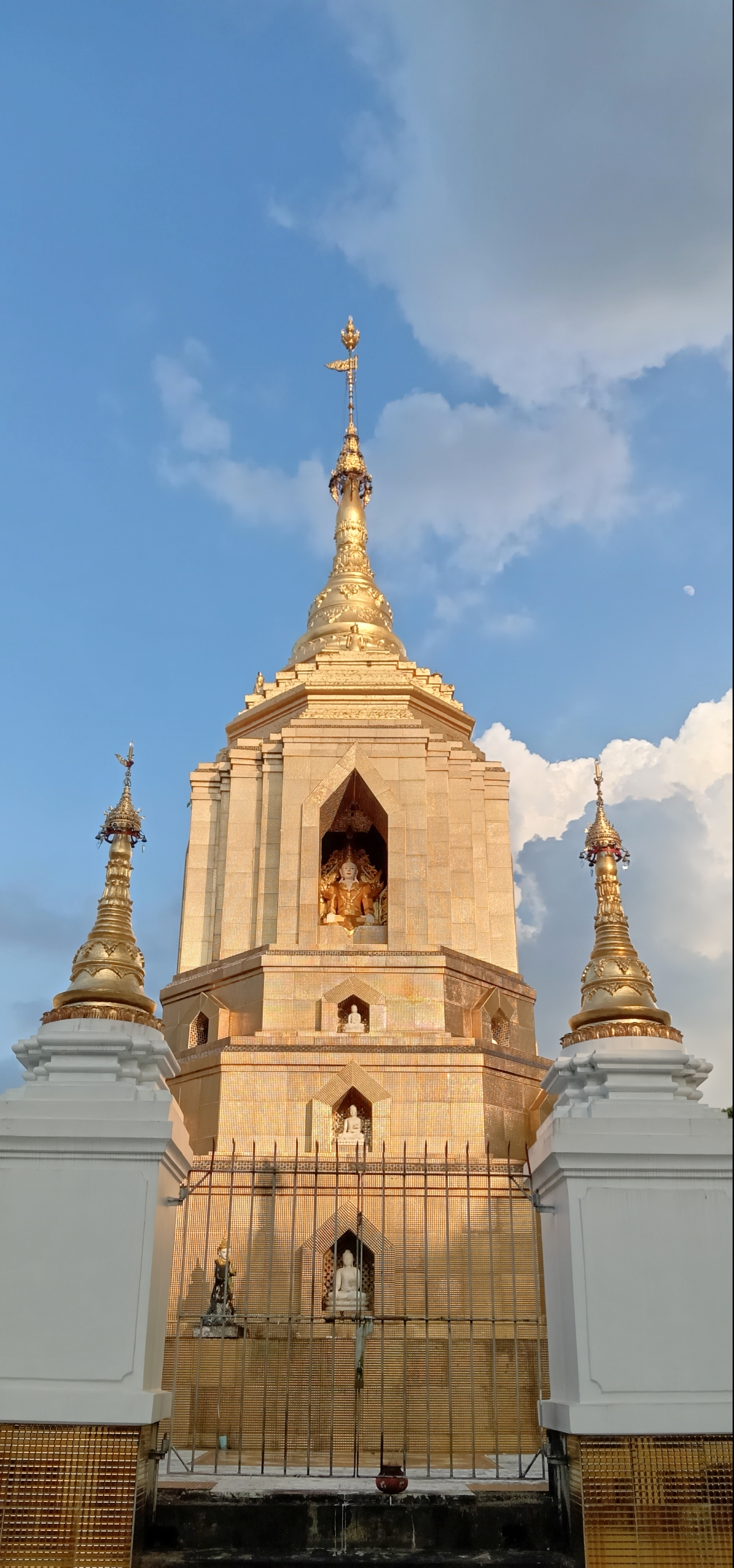
Dat Poung Su Pagoda (Bodhi Hill, Yangon), site linked with Bo Min Gaung
