= Dhammānudhammapaṭipatti (treatise) =

Thai buddhist text

Dhammānudhammapaṭipatti (also spelled Thammanuthamma-patipatti, 'Practice in perfect conformity with the Dhamma') (Thai: ธัมมานุธัมมปฏิปัตติ) is an important Thai Buddhist text which deals with different stages of awakening.

== History ==
The text was originally printed in five parts between 1932 and 1934 with no author given. It was later associated with Venerable Luang Pu Mun the founder of the Thai Forest Tradition. While no authoritative biographies of Luang Pu Mun credit him with authorship later editions of the text began naming him as author and picturing him on the cover. The text has also been attributed to maechi Khunying Yai Damrongthammasan.

In 2013, Martin Seeger from the University of Leeds School of Modern Languages and Cultures uncovered evidence that Khunying Yai Damrongthammasan, a Thai laywoman, was the true author of the text. It isn't known why Khunying Yai's name wasn't on the first publication of the text but Seeger had some theories.

"The real reason that Khunying Yai decided to omit her name from the first edition might never be known, but there are several possibilities. At the time people may have considered it inappropriate for a woman to discuss Buddhist doctrine on such a profound level. Or she might have thought that Buddhist doctrine should be independent of an individual. Another possibility is that the conversations described actually took place in the group of women who met regularly in the temple of Wat Sattanatpariwat to discuss Buddhism, and she wanted to remain anonymous out of respect for them."

Justin McDaniel, associate professor of South-East Asian and religious studies at the University of Pennsylvania, said "You have to understand that authorship in Thailand is never considered to be by just one person. This idea that a single person owns ideas is seen as a ridiculous notion."

== Content of the text ==
Thammanuthamma-patipatti is in the form of a dialogue, supposedly between two prominent Thai monks of the 20th century, an oft used format in Buddhist scriptures (see Diamond Sutra for a similar format).
