= Gatha =

Gatha or gāthā is a verse, stanza, poem, mantra or hymn.

Gatha may also refer to:

- Gatha (India), verses in Sanskrit and Prakrit
  - Gatha (Buddhism), Buddhist version of gatha
- Gatha (Zoroaster), hymns of Zoroastrianism
