= Linn Nhyo Taryar =

Burmese astrologer and fortune teller (born 1995)

- လင်းညှို့တာရာ
- Born: Hein Min Aung; September 15, 1995 (age 30); Pathein, Myanmar
- Occupations: Astrologer, fortune-teller, writer, anti-junta activist, political prisoner
- Criminal charge: High treason
- Criminal penalty: 2 years in prison

Linn Nhyo Taryar (Burmese: လင်းညှို့တာရာ; born on 15 September 1995), also known as Hein Min Aung (Burmese: ဟိန်းမင်းအောင်), is a Burmese astrologer and writer, known for his yadaya rituals and fortune predictions. He was arrested for high treason after posting a video in which he prayed for the downfall of the Burmese army general Min Aung Hlaing, who took power during the 2021 Myanmar coup d'état.

== Career ==
An orphan from Pathein, in the Ayeyarwady delta region, he came to Yangon as a teenager and studied engineering before dropping out of school to become an astrologist. He started studying magic when he was five, beginning by reading tarot cards and gradually building up an online following on Facebook. He made yearly predictions and advised people on how to avoid trouble. He told The Voice Daily in an interview that there were some politicians who believed in voodoo. He also revealed that some notable politicians and businessmen had asked him for astrological advice before the 2015 general election. In 2016, he founded the Wizardry School of Myanmar, a lesson of which was attended by an interviewer from Agence France-Presse (AFP).

A week after AFP attended the lesson, Linn Nhyo Taryar was issued arrest warrants after social media users told police he was teaching people how to use black magic. On 14 January 2007, he was arrested for opening a magic training school without permission in Yangon. The police seized his school and released him after 4 months in prison.

Following the 2021 Myanmar coup d'état, he was arrested under the Penal Code's Section 505 (b) on 11 February due to a viral video showing him lighting candles and praying for the military government to fall. Thousand of people rallied and protested for four consecutive days in front of the police station for his release. He has become a focal point for demonstrators, with his image often displayed by people resisting the coup.

He has heart disease and can only breathe when given oxygen. His family attempted to supply him with medication, but they were unsuccessful.

He was arbitrarily sentenced to 2 years in prison by junta's court on 27 December 2021. He released from prison on 4 November 2022.
