= Bo Bo Aung =

18th-century Burmese wizard

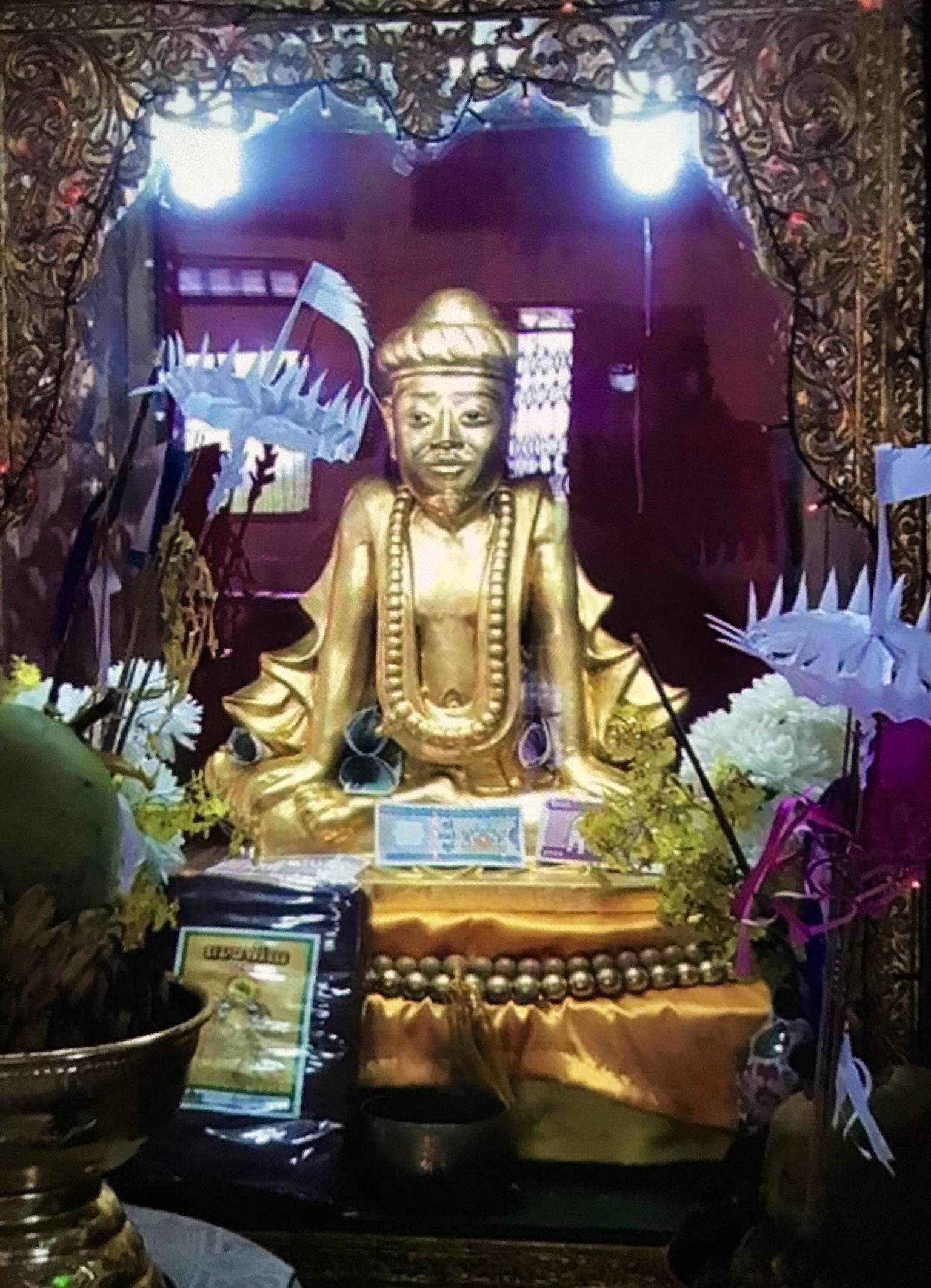
Statue of Bo Bo Aung

Bo Bo Aung (Burmese: ဘိုးဘိုးအောင်) was a prominent Burmese weizza or wizard (Burmese: ဝိဇ္ဇာ, Pali: vijjādhara) from Sagaing, who lived in Myanmar under the Konbaung dynasty (18th century). He was also called Maung Aung, or "Master Victory". He supposedly lived to be around 200 years of age. He is credited with creating the modern weizza movement when he discovered manuscripts revealing the secrets of weizzas and mastered the art of qi. "Bo Bo" is a common Burmese honorific which translates to "grandpa".

== Early life ==
=== Childhood ===
Aung's exact birthdate is unknown, though he was a classmate of the future King Bodawpaya, who was born in the Burmese era 1106, as well as of the future Taungpila Sayadaw. Aung's name at birth was Pho Aung. His father was Pho Myat San and his mother was Mae Nyein Yar. Due to his parents' lack of financial resources, Aung was malnourished as a child. Consequently, he suffered from skin disease and was taunted by his peers, who called him "Maung Wei". "Maung" means "teenage boy" and "wei" being a Burmese word for scabies.

=== The Sayadaw's dream ===
One day, while the Kye Ni Sayadaw was having a nap, he dreamed that he was woken by a holy man dressed in white. In the dream, the man in white led him to the lake at the back of the monastery, gestured to a specific area of the lake, then disappeared. When the Sayadaw awoke, he felt as if the dream were real. Days later, he was thinking about his dream and went out to the lake to look again at the spot the white robed man pointed to. When he reached the edge of the lake he felt something in the water under a tree. It was a copper manuscript. He washed it off and took it to the monastery.

=== The dirty pillow ===
Not long after this, the Sayadaw died. He was cremated and his remains were entombed and his three main disciples began to divide his possessions. The new Sayadaw jokingly threw an old pillow to Aung, and told him that that was his inheritance from the former Sayadaw. Out of respect, Aung accepted it. He used it to balance his elbow while he wrote on the floor. The pillow eventually began to tear and he saw that there was something hard inside the pillow. Later, he overheard some wise men discussing the lost copper manuscript of the former Sayardaw.

== Attempted assassination ==
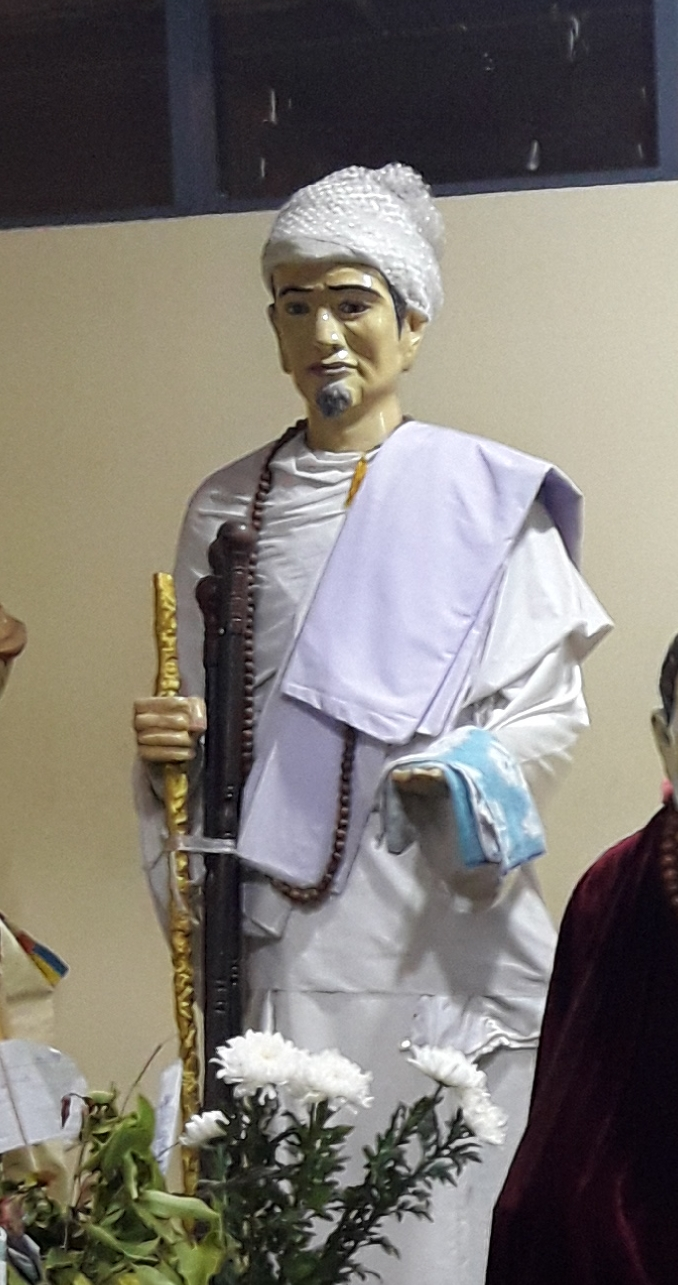
Statue of Bo Bo Aung

When Aung became a powerful weizza or wizard, his old classmate, King Bodawpaya attempted to have him assassinated because he refused to acknowledge him as the future Buddha, Metteya. First, he sent a team of soldiers to find Aung. The soldiers begged him to return with them, saying that they would be killed if they failed the king. Aung ordered the soldiers to send a report to the king that they had captured him and put him in chains at the bottom of their boat. He promised them that he would appear in the boat when it arrived at the capital.

The soldiers did as he said. When their boat reached the capital two weeks later, they found Aung lying at the bottom of the boat, tied in chains. Bodawpaya gathered his people to witness the execution. He ordered the executioners to throw Aung into a deep ditch and buried him alive. Later that evening, when Bodawpaya was meeting with his ministers, Aung appeared. He told the king that he was a false friends and reminded him that they had sworn eternal friendship to each other. He told him that he did not want to take over his kingdom. He wrote a circle in chalk on the palace floor and presented a challenge to the king. He told the king to erase the chalk drawing from the floor. The King, full of shame and anger, rubbed out the circle but then two more appeared. He continued to try to erase the chalk circles until the whole palace floor was covered with hundreds of them. Aung again chided the king, who begged him to protect his family. Aung vowed to do that and then vanished.

== Legacy ==
Many Burmese Buddhists believe that Aung never died, but remains on Earth to wait for the appearance of the future Buddha, Metteya, and protect the Dharma. They believe that he is available to help pious laypeople in their daily struggles. He is often accompanied by a statue of Bo Min Gaung, another prominent weizza, on Buddhist altars in Myanmar.

=== The Freedom Movement ===
In the first half of the 20th century, many Burmese Buddhists associated Aung with the Freedom Movement, an anti-colonial Burmese social movement against the British rule in Burma. The movement sought to draw on his mystical weizzas powers. Bogyoke Aung San (the father of Aung San Suu Kyi) was considered to have been the reincarnation of Aung himself.
