= Weizza =

Mythical Burma Buddhist Figure

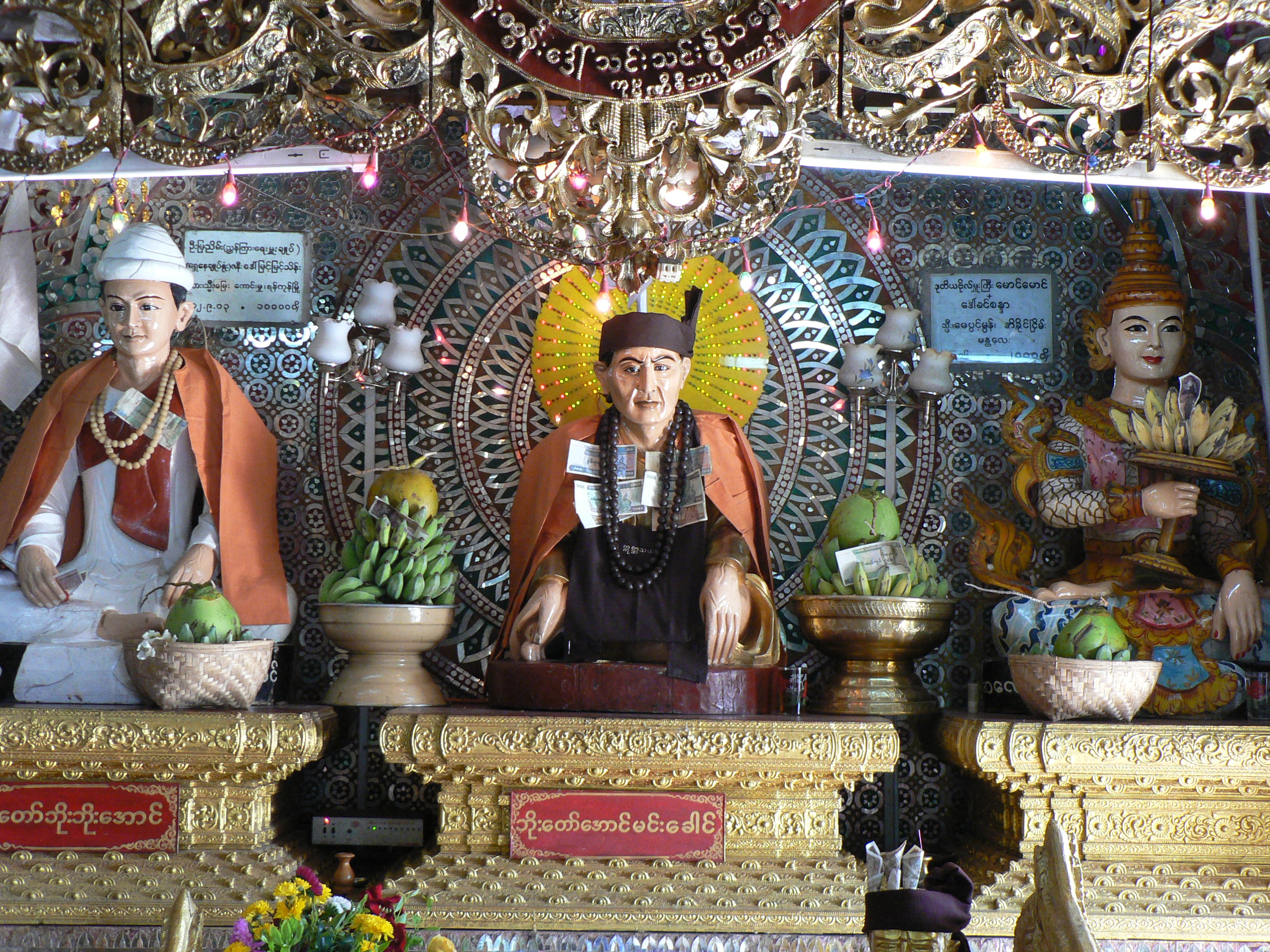
An altar depicting nats and weizza (Taw Bo Bo Aung, Bodaw Aung Mingaung), Mount Popa, Myanmar

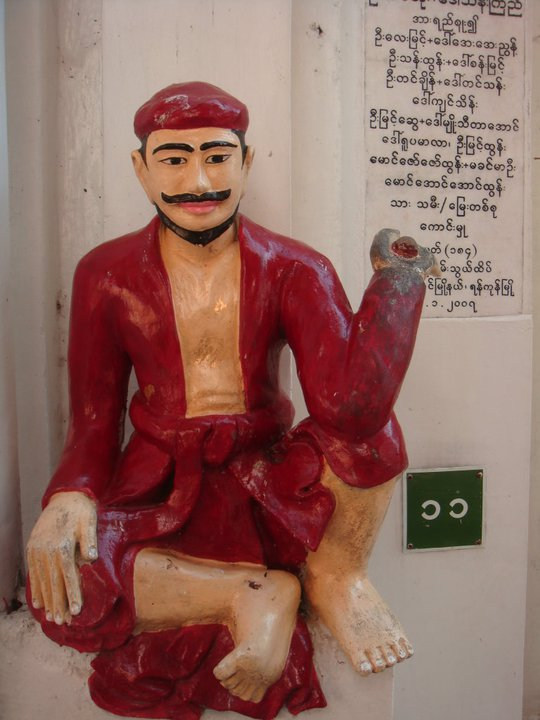
A weizza statue at Shwedagon Pagoda

A weizza or weikza (Burmese: ဝိဇ္ဇာ, Pali: vijjādhara) is a mystic in Burmese Buddhism commonly associated with esoteric and heterodox practices such as recitation of spells, samatha, and alchemy. The goal of this practice is to achieve immortality and await the appearance of the future Buddha, Metteya.

Weikza practices are less common than merit-making practices or vipassanā meditation. During the socialist era from 1962 to 1988, Ne Win banned secret weizza associations, weizza magazines and literature, and portrayals of weizza from films and other media, but the concept has made a resurgence since 1988, particularly following the abolition of the national censorship board in 2012. Burmese pagodas often house weizza shrines, where they are venerated for their spiritual purity and their devotion to those in need. Weizza teachers have also amassed hundreds of thousands of followers using social media.

== Etymology ==
The word weizza (ဝိဇ္ဇာ) comes from the Pali word vijja, which means “knowledge” or “wisdom”, and is distantly related to the English word "wizard", as both stem ultimately from the Proto-Indo-European root *weyd-, meaning "to know or see".

== Weizza in the historical tradition ==
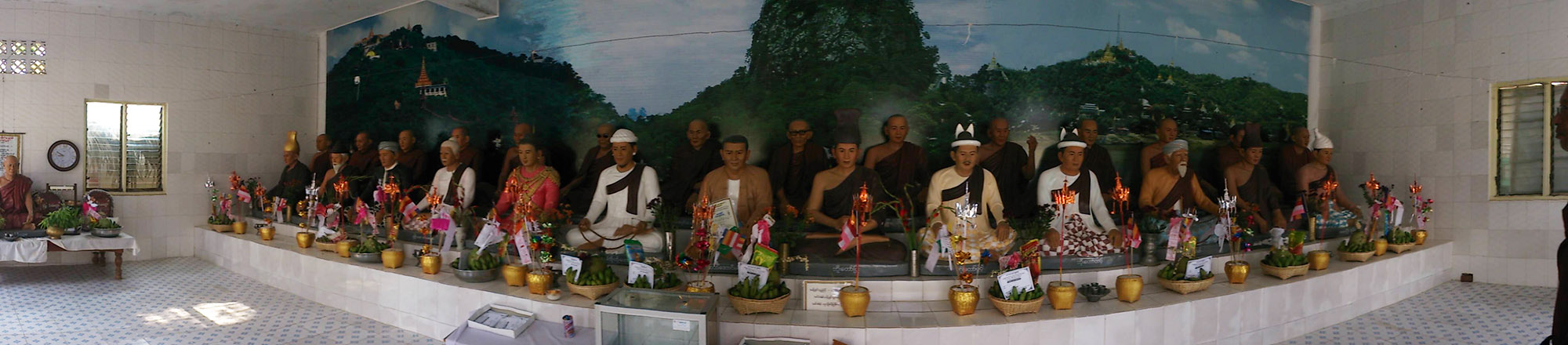
Famous yogis and weizza from Myanmar

Aside from epigraphs, there are no local Indic or vernacular compositions that have been securely dated to pre-Pagan Burma. However, there are some later attributions of texts that were written during the first millennium. One such example is the Kappālaṅkāra (ကပ္ပါလင်္ကာရ), a vijjādhara (weizza) text said to have been written by the bhikkhu Uttamasīri during the first century CE. The text survives in an 18th-century Pali-Burmese nissaya version (which attributes the text to Uttamasīri in its colophon) compiled by Taungdwin Sayadaw Ñaṇābhidhammālaṅkāra.

In Myanmar, there are two classes of wizards; the sôns (စုန်း) and the weizza. The former are considered a bane to society, while the latter spend their days helping the common folk and undoing the curses brought upon by the sôns. The weizza commonly known today first appeared during the Konbaung dynasty, when Bo Bo Aung, a monk in Sagaing, discovered manuscripts revealing the secrets of weizza. However, many recognized weizza today come from beforehand, the Konbaung dynasty having been the last to rule Burma before its colonisation. Before weizza, there were the Zawgyi (ဇော်ဂျီ) and Yawgi (ယောဂီ). The Zawgyi were wizards who were written about in Burmese literature, while the Yawgi were Buddhist yogis who lead ascetic lives and wore brown robes. They followed eight to ten precepts of Buddhism, whereas most laymen follow five.

=== Weizza orders ===
weizza are divided into four major orders:

1. The Pyada Weizza, who work with mercury
2. The Than Weizza, who work with iron
3. The Se Weizza, who specialize in medicine
4. The In Weizza, who specialize in yantra signs and squares

Among these, the Than and In are considered the most powerful. The Pyada Weizza, or Mercury Wizards, also study alchemy in order to produce gold and silver from more common metals. The Than weizza are considered by their followers as masters of not only their subject, but also as medical advisors.

== Purported abilities ==
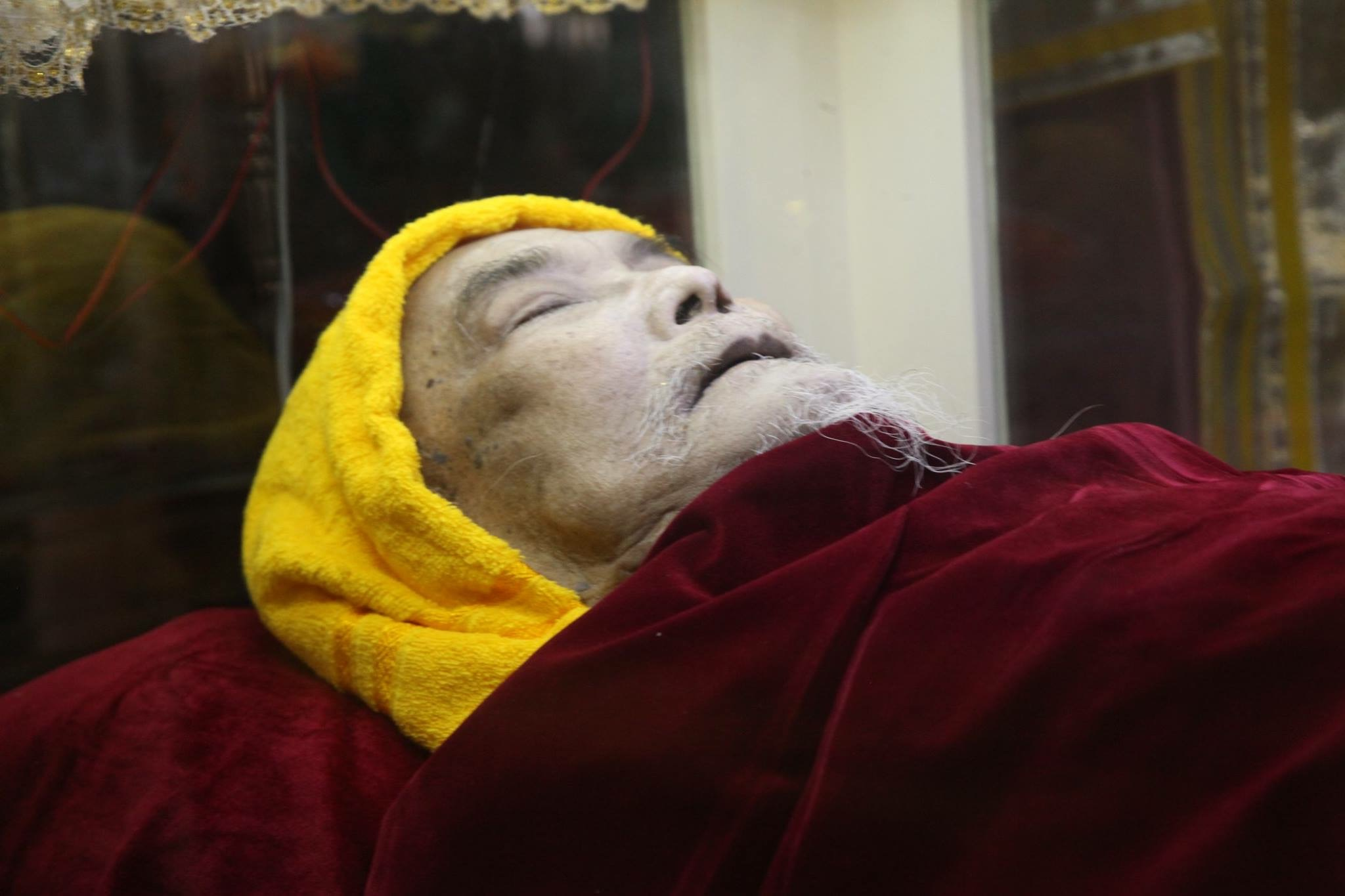
The Kyaikhtisaung Sayadaw's Body

Among their powers, weizza possess the ability to see past lives, see and hear things that are far away, read minds, teleport, dive into the earth, walk on water, and be in multiple places simultaneously. Powerful practitioners of the weizza’s way are purported to live for centuries, even choosing the time of their next reincarnation. The In Weizza, who work with cabalistic squares, use one's birth date and time to create powerful charms and spells. In The Burman, Sir J. George Scott described some squares and charms so powerful that they could set a house ablaze. Others, engraved in stone and embedded in one's skin, would prevent drowning. Merely scratching an in in a house or tree could cause lightning to strike it.

=== Tools of the trade ===
==== Weizza grimoires ====
Two traditional manuscripts contain rudimentary guidelines on the practices of weizza: the Bedin (ဗေဒင်) and the Deittôn (ဒိတ္တုန်). The latter is a book on astrology and metaphysics. Containing just basic principles of the art of weizza, the teachings in these texts are often surpassed by the weizza's own individual study and personal advancement. However, these books were once complete, many having been burned by religious zealots in the time of the last Buddha. The remains were spared from the fire by Devadatta, the cousin of Shin Gautama. Devadatta was always plotting against Shin Gautama, so he saved portions of the old science. Thus, this style of learning is looked upon with suspicion by many religious folk.

==== Medical remedies ====
Weizza prescriptions may be composed of chili powder, cloves, and ginger for fevers to earth-oil infused with seeds, bark, leaves, flowers, roots, and minerals. Weizza are specially adept with pills and powders, which are carried in bright red phials made of heavily scented bamboo. These ingredients are gathered with attention to the phases of the moon and placement of the constellations. Another potent ingredient in the weizza's cabinet is meteoric stones, which can be gathered within three days of lightning striking a piece of earth and are used as ophthalmic medicine. Weizza seldom use liquids in their practice of medicine.

===== Medical philosophies =====
Two schools of thought exist in weizza medicine:

1. The datsayās, whose primary focus is on diets
2. The beindawsayās, who work with potent drugs

In both schools, the human body is divided into four elements (dats): earth (patawi dat), fire (tezaw dat), water (apaw dat), and air (wayaw dat). Some practitioners also include ether (akatha), though this element is disregarded by doctors.

1. Earth: the flesh, bones, hair, intestines, etc.
2. Fire: eating, drinking, chewing, and licking
3. Water: the fat, blood, bile, spittle, mucus, etc.
4. Air: the six kinds of winds

== Modern perception of weizza ==
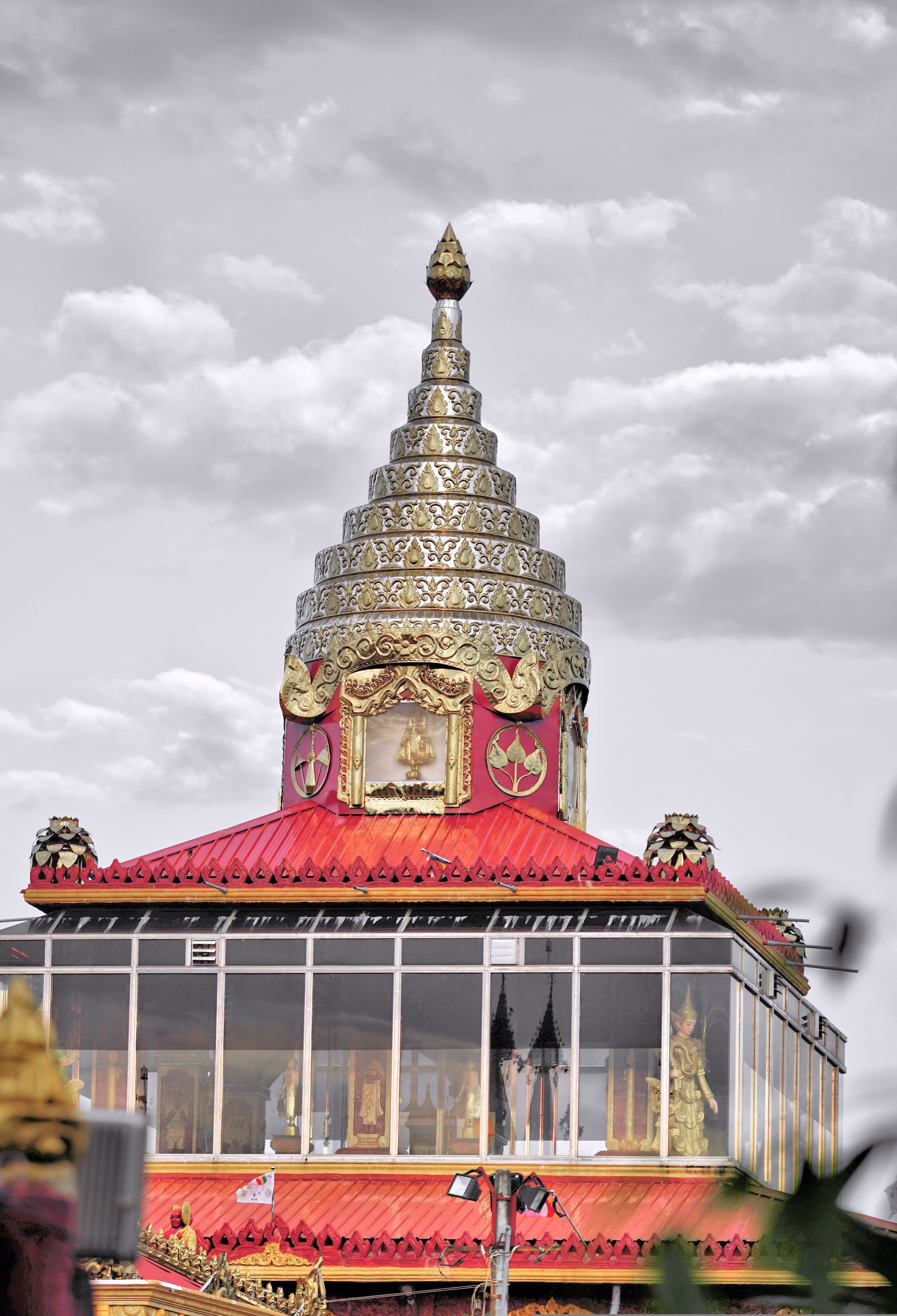
Final Resting Hall of the Kyaikhtisaung Sayadaw

Weizza following still exists in Myanmar today. The former government forbade the publication of weizza materials and selling of weizza prints, which are popular in household altars. Even so, weizza followers abound. There exist exclusive groups of weizza devotees called gaing (ဂိုဏ်း). These groups follow a set of tenets, are headed by a charismatic leader, and center their devotion on one or more weizza saints.

== Notable weizza ==
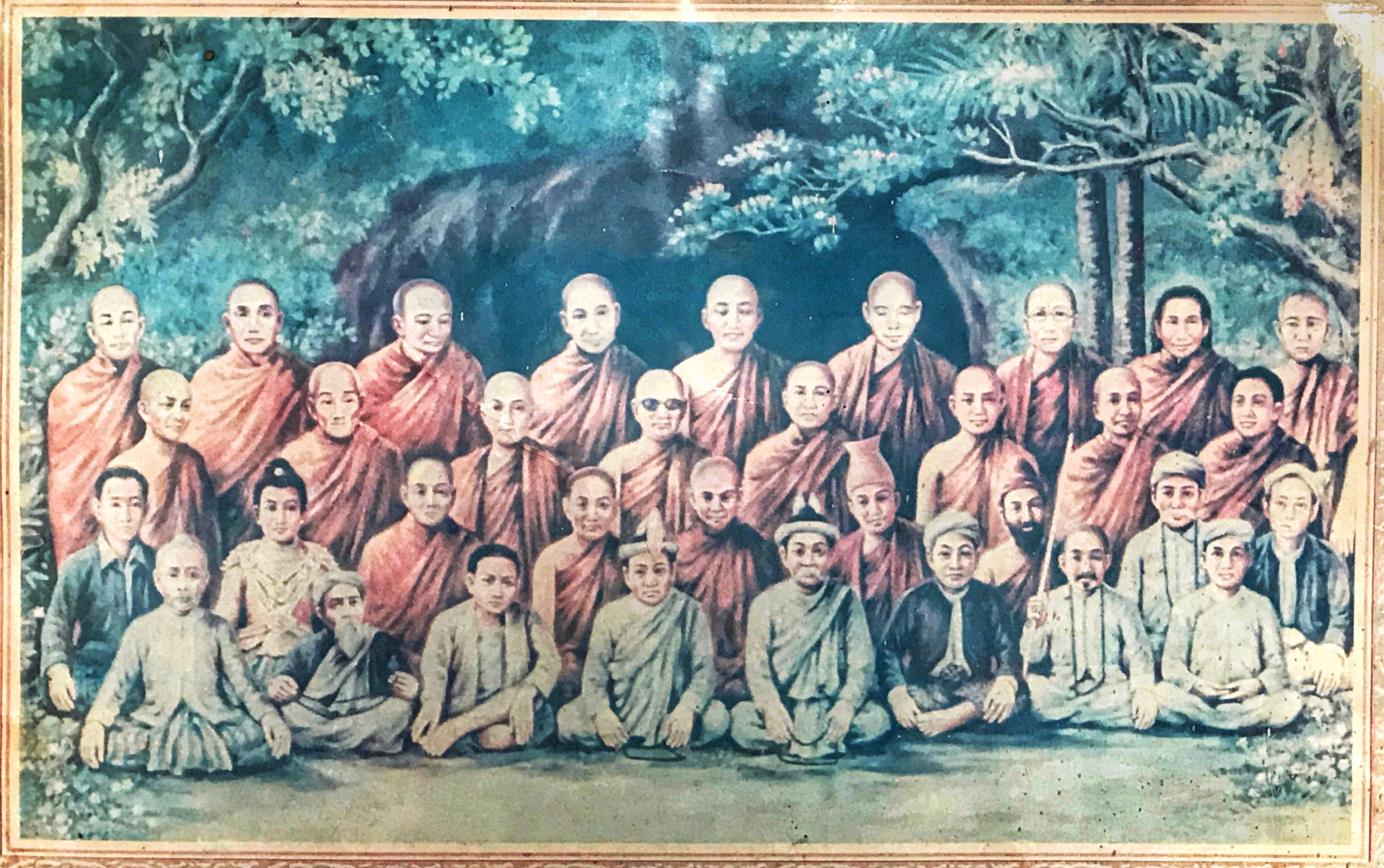
A list of notable weizza

- Bo Bo Aung
- Bo Min Gaung
- Kyaikhtisaung Sayadaw
- Setkya Mintha

== See also ==
- Rishi
- Sadhu
- Sennin
- Vidyadhara
- Xian
